= Bernie Dresel =

American drummer

- Born: Bernard John Dresel Jr. November 12, 1961 (age 64); Sharon, Pennsylvania, U.S.
- Genres: Jazz, rock, rockabilly
- Occupation: Musician
- Instrument: Drums
- Website: berniedresel.com

Bernard John Dresel Jr. (born November 12, 1961) is an American studio drummer and percussionist. He has been with multi-Grammy award-winning artists and recordings; most notably having performed and recorded extensively with The Brian Setzer Orchestra and Gordon Goodwin's Big Phat Band. The BBB Featuring Bernie Dresel (his own big band) has been performing since 2014 in numerous, prominent venues in Los Angeles and has recorded two notable CDs. He has recorded on numerous television shows and close to 60 movie soundtracks to include The Simpsons, Family Guy, King of the Hill, The Sopranos, Incredibles 2, The Bourne Supremacy, Cars 2, Up, Super 8, The Mask, Inside Out 2, and Elf.

== Biography ==
=== Early life and education ===
Dresel was born on November 12, 1961, in Sharon, Pennsylvania. His parents gave him a toy paper-head drum kit at age two. He was inspired by seeing Ringo Starr and the Beatles perform on the Ed Sullivan Show, received a copy of Meet The Beatles from his grandmother, and started drum lessons at the age of four and a half. Through the age of seventeen, Dresel studied with Robert Bydell, the timpanist with the Youngstown Symphony. He played music in elementary school programs and participated in drum corps ensembles. In 1970 at age 10 he won three national drum competitions at the NBTA National Championship held at Notre Dame University in South Bend, Indiana. After graduating from high school in 1979 he enrolled in the Eastman School of Music in Rochester, New York, to study orchestral drumming and majored in music education. His younger brother, Jonathan Dresel, is a drummer who has performed on the television show Jimmy Kimmel Live.

=== Move to Los Angeles ===
After graduating from Eastman in 1983, Dresel moved to Los Angeles. He intended to complete the California CBEST teaching certification test, but within three weeks he got a job at Aladdin Hotel in Las Vegas supporting the Albaricci Sisters. He went on tour for six months with The Lettermen and in 1986 with Maynard Ferguson. A former classmate at Eastman recommended him for a job in the studio band for the television show Our House. After that he became a session musician for television and films. He performed with his idol Ringo Starr on the Dame Edna television series. He recorded on the Man of Steel soundtrack by Hans Zimmer.

In 1992 Dresel was asked to join Brian Setzer's 16-piece rockabilly big band for two performances. Committed to a previously scheduled engagement, Dresel had to decline the first offer. Receiving a second call informing him that Setzer wanted him for an extended tour, he permanently joined the Brian Setzer Orchestra. Dresel recorded and toured with the Brian Setzer Orchestra over the next 15 years recording four albums (until 2006). The triple-platinum album The Dirty Boogie was released in 1998 and reached number 9 on the Billboard Top 200 albums. The top 40 hit single from the album "Jump, Jive an' Wail" won the 1999 Grammy Award for Best Pop Performance by a Duo or Group with Vocals and the song "Sleepwalk" won the Grammy Award for Best Pop Instrumental Performance. He recorded with Setzer on Ignition!, Nitro Burnin' Funny Daddy and Rockabilly Riot.

Dresel was the drummer for Gordon Goodwin's Big Phat Band since its beginning in 2000 until 2015, appearing on ten recordings. The Big Phat Band won three Grammy Awards in 2003, 2006, 2007, 2008 and 2011. Other albums Dresel appears on include David Byrne's The Forest (1998), Keiko Matsui's Cherry Blossoms (1992), Orange Crate Art (1995) by Brian Wilson and Van Dyke Parks, Andy Summers' Green Chimneys: The Music of Thelonious Monk (1999), Big Bad Voodoo Daddy's How Big Can You Get?: The Music of Cab Calloway (2009) and Michael Feinstein's The Sinatra Project, Vol. 2: The Good Life (2011).

Since 2014 Dresel has been leading two bands: the funk band BERN and The BBB Featuring Bernie Dresel. Dresel and Bill Cunliffe led the band Porcupine.

Dresel has been on the faculty of University of Nevada Las Vegas and taught private lessons in Los Angeles. He created video lessons and wrote two Big Phat Band Play-Along Series (Volume 1 and Volume 2) for drums with Gordon Goodwin. He has worked at educational conferences such as ASMAC, PASIC, and the Jazz Education Network.

== Awards and honors ==
=== Grammy Awards ===
- Best Large Jazz Ensemble Album - Life in the Bubble (2016)
- Best Pop Instrumental Performance - Caravan (2000)
- Best Pop Performance by a Duo or Group with Vocals - Jump Jive An' Wail (1998)

=== Grammy Award nominations ===
- Best Pop Instrumental Performance - Sleepwalk (2010)
- Best Large Jazz Ensemble Album - Act Your Age (2008)
- Best Classical Crossover Album - Wolfgang's Big Night Out (2007)
- Best Pop Instrumental Performance - My Favorite Things (2006)
- Best Pop Instrumental Performance - Rat Pack Boogie (2004)
- Best Large Jazz Ensemble Album – XXL (2003)
- Best Pop Instrumental Performance - The Nutcracker Suite (2003)

=== Other awards ===
- Drum! Magazine: On list of "53 Heavyweight Drummers Who Made a Difference in the 90's"
- Drum! Magazine: 2002 "Drummie Award" Best Big Band Drummer
- Modern Drummer Magazine: 1999 "Best Big Band Drummer"

== Discography ==
=== As leader ===
- Live N' Bernin' (Monster Music, 2016)
- Bern Bern Bern (DIG-IT. 2018)
- The Pugilist (DIG-IT. 2021)
- Number One Son (Soundscapes Media, 2025)

=== As sideman ===
With Gordon Goodwin's Big Phat Band

- Swingin' for the Fences (Immergent, 2001)
- XXL (Silverline, 2003)
- The Phat Pack (Silverline, 2006)
- Bah, Humduck! A Looney Tunes Christmas (Immergent, 2006)
- Act Your Age (Immergent, 2008)
- Dave Siebels With: Gordon Goodwin's Big Phat Band (PBGL, 2009)
- That's How We Roll (Telarc, 2011)
- Life in the Bubble (Telarc, 2014)
- A Big Phat Christmas (Allegro, 2015)

With Gloria Loring

- Is There Anybody Out There (USA Music Group, 1994)
- Friends & Lovers (LML, 2005)

With Keiko Matsui

- Night Waltz (CGR, 1991)
- Cherry Blossom (White Cat, 1992)
- A Drop of Water (White Cat, 1993)
- Dream Walk (Countdown, 1996)
- Full Moon and the Shine (Countdown, 1998)

With Eddy Mitchell

- Frenchy (Polydor, 2003)
- Jambalaya (Polydor, 2006)
- La Meme Tribu Volume 1+2 (Polydor, 2018)

With Van Dyke Parks

- Orange Crate Art (Warner Bros., 1995)
- Moonlighting: Live at the Ash Grove (Warner Bros., 1998)

With Brian Setzer

- The Brian Setzer Orchestra (1994)
- Guitar Slinger (1996)
- The Dirty Boogie (1998)
- Vavoom! (2000)
- Jumpin' East of Java (2001)
- Ignition! (2001)
- Boogie Woogie Christmas (2002)
- Nitro Burnin' Funny Daddy (2003)
- Dig That Crazy Christmas (2005)
- Rockabilly Riot (2005)
- 13 (2006)
- Wolfgang's Big Night Out (2007)
- Songs from Lonely Avenue (2009)
- Don't Mess With a Big Band (Live!) (2010)
- Rockin' Rudolph (2015)

With others

- Carl Anderson, Pieces of a Heart (1991)
- Big Bad Voodoo Daddy, How Big Can You Get?: The Music of Cab Calloway (Big Bad, 2009)
- Alf Clausen Jazz Orchestra, Swing Can Really Hang You Up the Most (NoDak, 2005)
- José Feliciano, Americano (1996)
- Arthur Hanlon, Encuentros (1999)
- Gerry Mulligan, Legacy (1996)
- Reiner Schöne, Gnadenlos Verliebt (Koch, 1995)
- 2AM At The Sands featuring Andrew Samonsky

== Film and television soundtracks ==
=== Film ===
- The Bourne Supremacy
- Incredibles 2
- Jurassic World
- Man of Steel
- Mission: Impossible III
- Star Trek
- Batman v Superman: Dawn of Justice
- Whiplash
- Zootopia

=== Television ===
- The Cleveland Show
- Diagnosis Murder
- Family Guy
- Frasier
- It's Garry Shandling's Show
- King of the Hill
- Murder She Wrote
- Star Trek: The Next Generation
- Star Trek: Voyager
- The Simpsons
- The Sopranos
- American Comedy Awards
- American Music Awards
- Emmy Awards
- The Golden Globes
- Screen Actors Guild Awards
