= Ignition! =

Studio album by Brian Setzer
- Released: 12 June 2001
- Studios: The Village Recorder, West Los Angeles
- Genres: Rockabilly; rock and roll
- Label: Surfdog
- Producers: Brian Setzer, John Holbrook

Brian Setzer chronology
Rockin' By Myself (1993)	Ignition! (2001)	Nitro Burnin' Funny Daddy (2003)

Ignition! is a studio album by Brian Setzer released on June 12, 2001. Following fronting a swing orchestra in the 1990s, Ignition! marks Setzer's return to purist rockabilly fronting a trio, named the Brian Setzer '68 Comeback Special, in homage to 1968 TV Special of Elvis Presley.

== Reception ==
PopMatters described Ignition! as "an album that gets back to the musical truths he seemed to subscribe to from the very start with the Stray Cats, but which he seemingly covered up along the way."

== Track listing ==
All tracks composed and arranged by Brian Setzer; except where indicated

1. "Ignition!"
2. "5 Years, 4 Months, 3 Days"
3. "Hell Bent" (Setzer, Mike Himelstein)
4. "Hot Rod Girl" (Setzer, Mike Himelstein)
5. "8-Track"
6. "'59"
7. "Rooster Rock" (Setzer, Mark W. Winchester)
8. "Santa Rosa Rita"
9. "(The Legend of) Johnny Kool, Part 2"
10. "Get 'Em on the Ropes"
11. "Who Would Love This Car but Me?" (Setzer, Joe Strummer)
12. "Blue Café"
13. "Dreamsville"
14. "Malagueña" (Traditional; arranged by Setzer)
15. "Mystery Train (Live)" (Setzer, Junior Parker, Sam Phillips) (Japanese edition bonus track)
16. "Gene and Eddie (Live)" (Japanese edition bonus track)
17. "Rumble in Brighton (Live)" (Japanese edition bonus track)

== Personnel ==
- Brian Setzer - guitar, vocals

'68 Comeback Special

- Mark W. Winchester - slap bass; lead vocals on "Rooster Rock"
- Bernie Dresel - drums

with:

- The Brianaires - backing vocals on "Dreamsville"
