= Quartet San Francisco =

- Origin: San Francisco, California, United States
- Genres: Classical, jazz
- Years active: 2001–present
- Label: Violin Jazz
- Members: Jeremy Cohen; Joseph Christianson; Chad Kaltinger; Andrés Vera
- Past members: Matthew Szemela; Keith Lawrence; Kelley Maulbetsch; Alisa Rose; Michelle Djokic; Joel Cohen; Emily Onderdonk; Kayo Miki; Dawn Harms; James Shallenberger
- Website: quartetsanfrancisco.com

Quartet San Francisco is a non-traditional and eclectic string quartet led by violinist Jeremy Cohen. The group played their first concert in 2001 and has recorded five albums. Playing a wide range of music genres including jazz, blues, tango, swing, funk, and pop, the group challenges the traditional classical music foundation of the string quartet.

Quartet San Francisco won a tango music competition in New York in 2004, and their albums have been nominated five times for Grammy Awards: three in the Best Classical Crossover Album category and two for Best Engineered Album, Classical.

== Members ==
Quartet leader and violinist Jeremy Cohen founded the Quartet San Francisco as a forum to explore a multitude of musical styles that were important to him but were not being exercised in his work with other ensembles such as Turtle Island Quartet. Cohen produces the quartet's albums on his label, Violin Jazz. Classically trained under Itzhak Perlman and Anne Crowden, his playing style shows influences of violinists Fritz Kreisler, Joe Venuti, and Eddie South.

A native of Maine, Matthew Szemela joined the quartet in 2012. He has toured and recorded with singer-songwriter Nina Nastasia, recorded with Sufjan Stevens, and in 2006 served as concertmaster of the Hustla Symphony Orchestra for Jay-Z's Reasonable Doubt 10th Anniversary Concert at Radio City Music Hall in New York. He has collaborated with tap dancer, actor, and choreographer Savion Glover on his production Classical Savion, and he has appeared with Sting, Dave Stewart, Lana Del Rey, Cassandra Wilson, the Bill T. Jones/Arnie Zane Dance Company, guitarist Vernon Reid of Living Colour, Susan Sarandon, Beyoncé Knowles, and Olivia Newton-John.

Chad Kaltinger, a violist with QSF since 2012, grew up in Chicago and moved to San Francisco in 1997. He has been Principal Violist for Opera San Jose and the Santa Cruz Symphony and has toured in the US and Europe as a multi-instrumentalist with several singer-songwriters and bands. He studied privately at Northwestern University with Peter Slowik, at the University of Illinois with Emanuel Vardi, and the Aspen Music Festival as a fellowship recipient with Heidi Castleman and Victoria Chiang.

Andrés Vera, a native of Puerto Rico, began playing with the quartet in 2015. At 17 he was invited to join the Miami Symphony Orchestra as a section cellist. He holds a B.A. degree from the University of Miami and an M.M. degree and post-graduate Professional Studies Diploma from the San Francisco Conservatory of Music. He studied with Ross Harbaugh, Jean-Michel Fonteneau, and Jennifer Culp. He is a founding member of the Cello Street Quartet, with whom he traveled in 2014 to Russia, Kosovo, and Hungary for the U.S. State Department.

=== Past members ===
Kelley Maulbetsch played cello for the quartet from 2011 to 2015. Kelley is a freelance performer and teacher in the Bay Area. She is a member of the Santa Cruz, Monterey, Napa, and Modesto symphonies. She is also a member of the Sarasota Opera Festival and the Utah Festival Opera. Kelley has participated in music festivals such as Tanglewood, the National Repertory Orchestra, and AIMS in Graz, Austria. She is a member of Duo Cantando and Tango Porteno. She was a string ensemble coach at the Nueva School, a private teacher, and a faculty member of the Community Music Center in San Francisco. She is also a certified Suzuki instructor. Kelley received her BM in Cello Performance from the Cleveland Institute of Music, where she studied under Richard Aaron. She has also studied with Irene Sharp.

Alisa Rose played violin for Quartet San Francisco from 2009 to 2012. Born in Wisconsin, she has played in bluegrass bands and at festivals such as Hardly Strictly Bluegrass in San Francisco and the Strawberry Music Festival in Yosemite. She is director of a San Francisco Conservatory of Music program at a city elementary school and has written an instructional book aimed at music students aged seven to ten years old.

Keith Lawrence, member from March 2008 to 2012, began learning viola in Pittsburgh, Pennsylvania, at the age of 11, then pursued undergraduate study at Oberlin Conservatory, taking instruction from Peter Slowik and Roger Chase. He attended the Henry Mancini Institute three years during his time at Oberlin. Until 2007, he studied at the DePaul University School of Music with Rami Solomonow.

Michelle Djokic, cellist for the quartet, was a founder of Concordia Chamber Players in New Hope, Pennsylvania, and has lived in the San Francisco Bay Area since 2004. She served as assistant principal cellist of the San Francisco Symphony for two seasons. She joined the New Century Chamber Orchestra in 2008. She has appeared on stage and in the studio many times as a cello soloist, including Carnegie Hall with the New Jersey Symphony Orchestra, and as accompanist to violinist Nadja Salerno-Sonnenberg. She married professional squash athlete Mark Talbott.

Joel Cohen, Jeremy's brother, played cello in the group from its inception on Whirled Chamber Music in 2007 and into 2008. Cohen served as co-principal cellist with the Oakland East Bay Symphony from 1979 to 1985, after which he lived in Vienna to perform as principal cellist of the Vienna Chamber Orchestra. Cohen moved to Boston in 1997 and has been involved in various orchestras and chamber music groups including the Boston Symphony Orchestra. He is a member of the faculty of the College of the Holy Cross in Worcester, Massachusetts.

Emily Onderdonk, a San Francisco native, played viola in the group from its first recording in 2002 to early 2008. Onderdonk studied at Manhattan School of Music, earning her bachelor's and master's degrees, after which she enrolled in post-graduate studies at Boston University and the New England Conservatory of Music. She has served as principal violinist for the New York City Opera National Company, the Santa Fe Pro Musica Chamber Orchestra, the Berkeley Symphony Orchestra, the Reno Philharmonic Orchestra, the Opéra National de Lyon touring Europe, and the Sacramento Philharmonic Orchestra.

Kayo Miki helped Quartet San Francisco win the Grand Prize at a tango music competition in May 2004 at the auditorium of the Consulate General of Argentina in New York City. The prize included a trip to Buenos Aires where the quartet performed at Cafe Tortoni and other classic tango dance venues. Born in Nanaimo, British Columbia, she studied violin at the Hochschule Mozarteum in Salzburg and earned bachelor's and master's degrees from the Eastman School of Music.

Dawn Harms, a cousin of musician Tom Waits, played violin in the group from 2002 until 2004. Harms has collaborated with a number of ensembles, including ten years as first violinist of the Harrington String Quartet and five years with the Santa Fe Opera. She is co-concertmaster of the Oakland East Bay Symphony and concertmaster with the Santa Fe Pro Musica Chamber Orchestra. She is on the faculty of the Music Department at Stanford University.

James "Jim" Shallenberger, a founding member of the Kronos Quartet, played violin on the 2002 recording Quartet San Francisco. Shallenberger is a member of the San Francisco Symphony Orchestra and the San Francisco Opera and Ballet Orchestras. He is one of the extended faculty of the San Francisco Conservatory of Music.

== Albums ==
Quartet San Francisco, the group's initial self-titled album, debuted in 2002. Cohen was joined by James Shallenberger on violin, Emily Onderdonk on viola, Joel Cohen on cello, and three tracks included James Kerwin on bass violin. Cohen included compositions by Scott and Brubeck, four Argentine tangos, and selections by Henry Mancini and Stevie Wonder.

Látigo, their 2006 CD which featured a number of tangos and Latin-inspired compositions, was nominated for Best Classical Crossover Album and Best Engineered Album, Classical. It was recorded August 22–24, 2005 at Skywalker Sound, with Jones as audio engineer, Kirschner as mixing engineer, and Bernie Grundman as mastering engineer.

The group released Whirled Chamber Music as a "mixture of American genres – blues, funk, jazz, tango, and rock." Among the 18 tunes are 7 composed by Raymond Scott. The album was recorded June 12–15, 2007, at Skywalker Sound with veteran audio engineer Leslie Ann Jones. Whirled Chamber Music was nominated for Best Classical Crossover Album.

QSF Plays Brubeck was released in 2009, and became the group's third consecutive nomination for Best Classical Crossover Album. The Dave Brubeck-inspired recording was also nominated for Best Engineered Album, Classical, honoring Judy Kirschner who recorded and mastered the album at Skywalker Sound. The album is the first all-Brubeck string quartet recording.

Pacific Premieres, the group's fifth album, was released in 2013. The album consists of compositions by four California based composers; Gordon Goodwin, Vince Mendoza, Patrick Williams and Cohen. Gordon Goodwin and Vince Mendoza were both nominated for Grammy Awards in the Best New Instrumental Composition category for their tracks on the album. The album was recorded at Skywalker Sound in August 2013.

QSF collaborated on the 2023 album Raymond Scott Reimagined, a tribute album honoring the cartoon composer Raymond Scott. On the project, QSF was joined by the bandleader Gordon Goodwin who led his Big Phat Band and arranged the music, including vocal parts for the singing group Take 6. The album was published by Cohen's own Violinjazz Recordings.

== Discography ==
- 4tet San Francisco (2002)
- Látigo (2006)
- Whirled Chamber Music (2007)
- QSF Plays Brubeck (2009)
- Pacific Premieres (2013)
- Raymond Scott Reimagined (with Gordon Goodwin's Big Phat Band and Take 6, 2023)
