= Act Your Age (Gordon Goodwin's Big Phat Band album) =

Studio album by Gordon Goodwin's Big Phat Band
- Released: September 30, 2008
- Genre: Jazz
- Length: 67:39
- Label: Immergent
- Producer: Lee Ritenour

Gordon Goodwin's Big Phat Band chronology
The Phat Pack (2006)	Act Your Age (2008)	That's How We Roll (2011)

Act Your Age is the fourth album by Gordon Goodwin's Big Phat Band. It received a Grammy Award nomination in 2008 for Best Large Jazz Ensemble Album. Gordon Goodwin received nominations for Best Instrumental Composition ("Hit the Ground Running") and Best Instrumental Arrangement ("Yesterdays").

Guests include Chick Corea performing his own composition, "Señor Mouse". Another track incorporates Zenph Studios' re-performance of Art Tatum's 1949 recording of "Yesterdays" with a big band arrangement by Goodwin.

The album includes a DVD containing recording studio footage and bonus features, such as a 5.1 surround sound mix of the album.

== Track listing ==
All tracks are written by Gordon Goodwin except where noted.

No.	Title	Writer(s)	Length
1.	"Hit the Ground Running"		4:56
2.	"Watermelon Man"	Herbie Hancock	5:28
3.	"September"	Al McKay, Allee Willis, Maurice White	4:29
4.	"Yesterdays"	Jerome Kern, Otto Harbach	3:19
5.	"Señor Mouse"	Chick Corea	5:00
6.	"Punta Del Soul"	Dave Grusin	5:04
7.	"Act Your Age"		5:04
8.	"Chance Encounters"		7:35
9.	"Backrow Politics"		8:05
10.	"East Coast Envy"		5:13
11.	"El Macho Muchacho"		6:10
12.	"Gumbo Street"		6:33

Source: AllMusic

== Personnel ==
Band

- Gordon Goodwin – piano, soprano saxophone, tenor saxophone
- Jeff Driskill – clarinet, flute, tenor saxophone
- Sal Lozano – flute, piccolo, alto saxophone
- Eric Marienthal – flute, alto saxophone, soprano saxophone
- Jay Mason – bass, bass clarinet, baritone saxophone
- Brian Scanlon – clarinet, flute, tenor saxophone
- Wayne Bergeron – trumpet
- Daniel Fornero – trumpet
- Dan Savant – trumpet
- Alex Iles – trombone
- Andy Martin – trombone
- Charlie Morillas – trombone
- Francisco Torres – trombone
- Craig Ware – bass trombone
- Grant Geissman – guitar
- Andrew Synowiec – guitar
- Bernie Dresel – drums
- Brad Dutz – percussion, vibraphone

Guests

- Chick Corea – piano
- Dave Grusin – piano
- Art Tatum – piano
- Lee Ritenour – guitar
- Nathan East – bass guitar
- Patti Austin – vocals

Technical

- David Helfant – executive producer
- John Trickett – executive producer
- David Tedds –producer
- Lee Ritenour – producer
- Gordon Goodwin – producer
- Dan Savant – producer
- Gary Lee – engineer
- Gus Skinas – engineer
- Bernie Kirsch – engineer
- Paul Klingberg – engineer, producer mixing, surround mix
- Tommy Vicari – engineer, mixing
- Richard King – engineer
- Michael Aarvold – digital editing, engineer
- Michael Atwell – digital editing
- Doug Sax – mastering
