= The Brian Setzer Orchestra (album) =

Studio album by The Brian Setzer Orchestra
- Released: March 22, 1994
- Studio: Capitol Studios, Hollywood, California
- Genre: Swing; jump blues
- Label: Hollywood
- Producer: Brian Setzer

The Brian Setzer Orchestra chronology
| The Brian Setzer Orchestra (1994) | Guitar Slinger (1996) |

Professional ratings
Review scores
| Source | Rating |
|---|---|
| AllMusic | 4/5 stars |
| Music Week | 2/5 stars |

The Brian Setzer Orchestra is the first studio album from the American swing revival band The Brian Setzer Orchestra, released in 1994.

== Track listing ==
1. "Lady Luck" (Brian Setzer)
2. "Ball and Chain" (Setzer)
3. "Sittin' On It All the Time" (Henry Bernard, Sydney Mann)
4. "Good Rockin' Daddy" (Richard Berry, Joe Josea)
5. "September Skies" (Bill Carter, Ruth Ellsworth Carter, Christine Schmidt, Setzer)
6. "Brand New Cadillac" (Vince Taylor)
7. "There's a Rainbow 'Round My Shoulder" (Dave Dreyer, Al Jolson, Billy Rose)
8. "Route 66" (Bobby Troup)
9. "Your True Love" (Carl Lee Perkins)
10. "A Nightingale Sang in Berkeley Square" (Eric Maschwitz, Manning Sherwin)
11. "Straight Up" (Dave Lambert, O. O. Merritt, Setzer)
12. "Drink That Bottle Down" (Jim Phantom, Lee Rocker, Setzer)

"Sittin' On It All the Time" includes re-recorded elements from "Monk's Dream" (Thelonious Monk) and "Take the "A" Train" (Billy Strayhorn)
"Brand New Cadillac" includes re-recorded elements from "Peter Gunn Theme" (Henry Mancini)
"Route 66" includes re-recorded elements from "Route 66 Television Theme" (Nelson Riddle)

== Personnel ==
- Brian Setzer - guitar, vocals
- Bob Parr - bass
- Gary Stockdale - piano
- Bernie Dresel - drums
- Michael Acosta - musical director, tenor saxophone
- Bob Sandman - 2nd tenor saxophone
- Ray Herrmann - 1st alto saxophone
- Steve Fowler - 2nd alto saxophone
- Don Roberts - baritone saxophone
- Dan Fornero - lead trumpet
- John Fumo, Les Lovitt, Ramon Flores - trumpet
- Art Valasco - lead trombone
- Bruce Fowler, Mark Jones - trombone
- Dana Hughes - baritone trombone

Technical

- Al Schmitt - recording, mixing
- Maria DeGrassi-Colosimo - art direction
- Maria Villar - graphic design

== Charts ==
| Chart (1994) | Peak position |
|---|---|
| US Billboard 200 | 158 |
