= Dave Siebels With: Gordon Goodwin's Big Phat Band =

Studio album by Gordon Goodwin's Big Phat Band & Dave Siebels
- Released: December 8, 2008
- Genre: Jazz
- Label: Pat Boone's Gold

Professional ratings
Review scores
Source	Rating
AllMusic	3.5/5 stars

Dave Siebels With: Gordon Goodwin's Big Phat Band is a jazz album, the sixth of Gordon Goodwin's Big Phat Band. The group teamed up with Dave Siebels, a veteran organist, using many of Siebel's original compositions. The album includes funk, bebop, and modern big band-style songs and was released on December 1, 2008.

== Track listing ==
1. "The Coupe"
2. "Not That There's Anything Wrong With That"
3. "Da Blues"
4. "Girl Talk"
5. "I Wish"
6. "The Gospel According to Hammond"
7. "I Love You Even More Again"
8. "The Cat"
9. "Sort of Like a Samba"
10. "The Eleventh Hour"

== Featured soloists ==
- Dave Siebels – organ
- Gordon Goodwin – tenor saxophone
- Eric Marienthal – alto saxophone
- Wayne Bergeron – trumpet
- Andy Martin – trombone
- Grant Geissman – guitar
- Brian Scanlon – tenor saxophone
- Sal Lozano – flute
