= Guitar Slinger =

Guitar Slinger may refer to:

- Guitar Slinger (Johnny Winter album), 1984
- Guitar Slinger (The Brian Setzer Orchestra album), 1996
- Guitar Slinger (Vince Gill album), 2011
