= Life in the Bubble =

Studio album by Gordon Goodwin's Big Phat Band
- Released: May 13, 2014
- Studio: Bill Schnee Studios, Eastwest Studios, G Studio Digital, Angel Song Studios, Capitol Records
- Genre: Jazz, big band
- Length: 63:33
- Label: Telarc
- Producer: Gordon Goodwin, John Burk, Dan Savant, Gregg Field

Gordon Goodwin's Big Phat Band chronology
That's How We Roll (2011)	Life in the Bubble (2014)	A Big Phat Christmas (2015)

Life in the Bubble is an album by Gordon Goodwin's Big Phat Band that won the Grammy Award for Best Large Jazz Ensemble Album in 2015. Goodwin won an additional Grammy Award for Best Instrumental Arrangement for his version of the song "On Green Dolphin Street".

== Track listing ==
All tracks are written by Gordon Goodwin except where noted.

No.	Title	Writer(s)	Length
1.	"Life in the Bubble"		6:47
2.	"Why We Can't Have Nice Things"		6:20
3.	"Synolicks"		8:16
4.	"Years of Therapy"		8:22
5.	"The Passage"		6:47
6.	"Garaje Gato"		6:51
7.	"Does This Chart Make Me Look Phat?"		8:21
8.	"Get Smart"	Irving Szathmary	4:28
9.	"On Green Dolphin Street"	Bronislaw Kaper, Ned Washington	3:37
10.	"Party Rockers"	Judith Hill	3:57

== Personnel ==
- Gordon Goodwin – tenor saxophone, piano
- Eric Marienthal – soprano saxophone, alto saxophone
- Kevin Garren – alto saxophone, tenor saxophone
- Sal Lozano – alto saxophone, flute, piccolo
- Jeff Driskill – tenor saxophone
- Brian Scanlon – tenor saxophone, clarinet
- Jay Mason – baritone saxophone, bass clarinet
- Charlie Morillas – trombone
- Craig Gosnell – trombone
- Andy Martin – trombone
- Francisco Torres – trombone
- Wayne Bergeron – trumpet
- Dan Fornero – trumpet
- Willie Murillo – trumpet
- Dan Savant – trumpet
- Bob Summers – trumpet
- Rick Shaw – double bass, bass guitar
- Andrew Synowiec – guitar
- Bernie Dresel – drums
- Joey De Leon Jr. – percussion
- Judith Hill – vocals

Production

- Gordon Goodwin – executive producer, liner notes
- John Burk – executive producer
- Dan Savant – producer
- Gregg Field – producer, engineer, mixing
- Tommy Vicari – engineer, mixing
- Michael Aarvold – engineer
- Charlie Paakkari – engineer
- Paul Blakemore – mastering
