= XXL (album) =

Studio album by Gordon Goodwin's Big Phat Band
- Released: September 23, 2003
- Genre: Jazz, big band
- Length: 73:23
- Label: Silverline
- Producer: Jeff Dean, Gordon Goodwin, Bob Michaels, Dan Savant, John Trickett

Gordon Goodwin's Big Phat Band chronology
Swingin' for the Fences (2001)	XXL (2003)	The Phat Pack (2006)

XXL is the second studio album by Gordon Goodwin's Big Phat Band, released on September 23, 2003. It includes guest performances by saxophonist Michael Brecker, Brian McKnight, vocal group Take 6, clarinetist Eddie Daniels, and singer Johnny Mathis.

XXL was nominated for the Grammy Award for Best Large Jazz Ensemble Album. Gordon Goodwin received two more nominations, one for Best Instrumental Composition ("Hunting Wabbits") and one for Best Instrumental Arrangement Accompanying Vocalist ("Comes Love").

== Track listing ==
All tracks are written by Gordon Goodwin except where noted.

No.	Title	Writer(s)	Length
1.	"High Maintenance"		6:17
2.	"A Game of Inches"		7:21
3.	"Comes Love featuring Brian McKnight & Take 6"	Lew Brown, Sam H. Stept, Charles Tobias	5:31
4.	"Thad Said No"		5:45
5.	"Hunting Wabbits"		6:20
6.	"The Quiet Corner"		6:20
7.	"Horn of Puente"		6:18
8.	"It's All Right With Me featuring Take 6"	Gordon Goodwin, Mark Kibble, Cole Porter	4:44
9.	"The Jazz Police"		4:44
10.	"Mozart 40th Symphony in G minor"		8:07
11.	"What Sammy Said"		7:50
12.	"Let the Good Times Roll featuring Johnny Mathis"	Fleecie Moore, Sam Theard	3:31

Source: AllMusic

== Personnel ==
- Gordon Goodwin – saxophone, piano, arranger, conductor
- Wayne Bergeron – trumpet
- Pete DeSiena – trumpet
- Daniel Fornero – trumpet
- Larry Hall – trumpet
- Stan Martin – trumpet
- Dan Savant – trumpet
- Bob Summers – trumpet
- Steven Holtman – trombone
- Alex Iles – trombone
- Nick Lane – trombone
- Andy Martin – trombone
- Charlie Morillas – trombone
- Craig Ware – bass trombone
- Sal Lozano – flute, alto saxophone, soprano saxophone
- Eric Marienthal – flute, alto saxophone, soprano saxophone
- John Yoakum – alto saxophone
- Brian Scanlon – clarinet, flute, tenor saxophone
- Jeff Driskill – clarinet, flute, tenor saxophone
- Eddie Daniels – clarinet
- Jay Mason – bass clarinet, flute, baritone saxophone
- Grant Geissman – guitar
- Carl Verheyen – guitar
- Richard Shaw – double bass, bass guitar
- Ray Brinker – drums
- Bernie Dresel – drums
- Luis Conte – percussion
- Mark Kibble – vocal arrangement

Guests

- Michael Brecker – saxophone
- Johnny Mathis – vocals
- Brian McKnight – vocals
- Take 6 – vocals
- Peter Erskine – drums

Production

- Gordon Goodwin – producer, liner notes
- Jeff Dean – executive producer
- Bob Michaels – executive producer
- John Trickett – executive producer
- Dan Savant – producer
- Bernie Grundman – mastering
- Steve Genewick – engineer
- Charles Paakkari – engineer
- Sam Story – engineer
- Kevin Szymanski – engineer
- Tommy Vicari – engineer
- Jeff Wakolbinger – engineer
