= The Ultimate Collection (The Brian Setzer Orchestra album) =

Live album by The Brian Setzer Orchestra
- Released: 2004
- Recorded: Disc-1: 30 June 1995; Disc-2: 22 February 2001
- Venue: Disc-1: Le Spectrum, Montreal, QC, Canada; Disc-2: Akasaka Blitz, Tokyo, Japan
- Label: Surfdog

The Brian Setzer Orchestra chronology
Boogie Woogie Christmas (2002)	The Ultimate Collection (2004)	Dig That Crazy Christmas (2005)

The Ultimate Collection is a 2-CD live album from the American swing revival band The Brian Setzer Orchestra, released in 2004.

== Track listing ==
=== Disc 1 ===
1. "Intro"
2. "James Bond Theme"
3. "Hoodoo Voodoo Doll"
4. "Good Rockin' Daddy"
5. "Your True Love"
6. "My Baby Only Cares For Me"
7. "Brand New Cadillac"
8. "Sittin' On It"
9. "Ghost Radio"
10. "(Every Time I Hear) That Mellow Saxophone"
11. "Rumble in Brighton"
12. "Route 66"
13. "Rock This Town"
14. "As Long As I'm Singin'"
15. "Honky Tonk"

=== Disc 2 ===
1. "Hawaii Five-O"
2. "This Cat's On a Hot Tin Roof"
3. "Dirty Boogie"
4. "Jumpin' East of Java"
5. "Drive Like Lightning (Crash Like Thunder)"
6. "Caravan"
7. "I Won't Stand in Your Way"
8. "Mystery Train"
9. "Gene & Eddie"
10. "Sleep Walk"
11. "Stray Cat Strut"
12. "Jump, Jive an' Wail"
13. "Pennsylvania 6-5000"
14. "Gettin' in the Mood"
15. "Get Me to the Church on Time"
16. "Rock This Town"
