= First Prize =

First Prize may refer to:

- First Prize (music diploma)
- First Prize (album), an album by George Gruntz's Concert Jazz Band
- First Prize!, an album by Eddie Daniels
