= Gordon Goodwin's Big Phat Band =

American 18-piece jazz orchestra

Gordon Goodwin's Big Phat Band, or simply The Big Phat Band, is an 18-piece jazz orchestra led by Gordon Goodwin (until his death in 2025) that combines the big band swing of the 1930s and 1940s with contemporary music such as funk and jazz fusion. Since its origin, the Big Phat Band has received several Grammy Awards and many Grammy nominations.

Its first album, Swingin' for the Fences, was the first recording released on DVD-Audio and the first DVD-Audio to be nominated for two Grammy Awards.

When he founded the Big Phat Band in 1999, Goodwin was working in Hollywood as a composer for Warner Brothers cartoons. His first attraction to big band music was at the age of 13 when he heard Count Basie.

== Band members ==
=== Saxophones ===
- Eric Marienthal – 1st alto saxophone, soprano saxophone, piccolo, flute (founding member)
- Sal Lozano – 2nd alto saxophone, clarinet, piccolo, flute (founding member)
- Brian Scanlon – 1st tenor saxophone, clarinet, flute (founding member)
- Jeff Driskill – 2nd tenor saxophone, clarinet, flute (founding member)
- Jay Mason – baritone saxophone, bass clarinet, flute (founding member)

=== Trumpets ===
- Wayne Bergeron – 1st trumpet (founding member)
- Mike Rocha – 2nd trumpet (since 2019)
- Ryan Deweese - 4th Trumpet (since 2024)

=== Trombones ===
- Andy Martin – 1st trombone (founding member)
- Charlie Morillas – 2nd trombone (since 2001)
- Francisco Torres – 3rd trombone (founding member – touring only)
- Craig Gosnell – bass trombone (since 2005)

=== Rhythm section ===
- Andy Waddell – guitar (since 2020)
- Kevin Axt – bass (since 2015)
- Ray Brinker – drums (since 2015)
- Joey DeLeon – percussion (since 2012)

=== Vocals ===
- Vangie Gunn - vocals (since 2019)

=== Temporary players ===
- Dan Higgins – 1st alto saxophone (Swingin' for the Fences)
- Grant Geissman – guitar (Swingin' for the Fences, XXL, The Phat Pack, Act Your Age)
- Carl Verheyen – guitar
- Luis Conte – percussion
- Dennis Farias – 1st trumpet (Sing Sang Sung)

=== Previous Players ===
- Gordon Goodwin – piano, conductor (1999–2025)
- Bernie Dresel - drums (1999–2015)
- Rick Shaw - bass (2001-2015)
- Bob Summers - trumpet (1999–2015)
- Craig Ware - bass trombone (1999–2011)
- Colin Meyer - trombone (touring only)
- Alex Iles - trombone (1999–2008)
- Willie Murillo - trumpet (2010–2020)
- Andrew Synowick - guitar (2008–2020)
- Dan Fornero - trumpet (2004 - 2025)
- Dan Savant (1999 - 2019)
- Brad Dutz - percussion (2005–2012)

=== Featured soloists ===
- Arturo Sandoval
- Brian McKnight
- Chick Corea
- Dave Grusin
- Dave Siebels
- David Sanborn
- Dianne Reeves
- Eddie Daniels
- James Morrison
- Johnny Mathis
- Judith Hill
- Lee Ritenour
- Marcus Miller
- Michael Brecker
- Nathan East
- Nikko Paolo Silangcruz
- Patti Austin
- Romain Guyot
- Take 6
- Toby Thomas

== Discography ==
- Swingin' for the Fences (Silverline, 2000)
- XXL (Silverline, 2003)
- The Phat Pack (Immergent, 2006)
- Bah, Humduck! A Looney Tunes Christmas (Immergent, 2006)
- Act Your Age (Immergent, 2008)
- Dave Siebels With: Gordon Goodwin's Big Phat Band (PBGL, 2009)
- That's How We Roll (Telarc, 2011)
- Life in the Bubble (Telarc, 2014)
- Wrap This! (Music of Content, 2015)
- The Gordian Knot (Music of Content, 2019)
- The Reset (Music of Content, 2021)
- Raymond Scott Reimagined (Violinjazz Recordings, 2023) with Quartet San Francisco
- 25 Years Of Phatness (Music of Content, 2026)

== Awards and honors ==
=== Grammy Awards ===
- Best Instrumental Arrangement – "On Green Dolphin Street" (2014)
- Best Large Jazz Ensemble Album, Life in the Bubble (2016)

=== Grammy Award nominations ===
- Best Large Jazz Ensemble Album – XXL (2003), Act Your Age (2008)
- Best Instrumental Composition – "Hunting Wabbits", (2003), "Hit the Ground Running" (2008), "Hunting Wabbits 3 (Get off my Lawn)" (2012)
- Best Instrumental Arrangement – "Attack of the Killer Tomatoes" (2006), "Yo Tannenbaum" (2007), "Yesterdays" (2008), "Rhapsody in Blue" (2012), "Party Rockers" (2015)
- Best Instrumental Arrangement with Vocals – "Comes Love" with Brian McKnight and Take 6 (2003)

=== Other awards ===
- Surround Sound Award, "Best Made for Surround Sound Title", XXL (2003)
