= Wayne Bergeron =

American jazz trumpeter (born 1958)

- Born: January 16, 1958 (age 68); Hartford, Connecticut, U.S.
- Genre: Jazz
- Occupation: Musician
- Instruments: Trumpet, flugelhorn
- Years active: 1980–present
- Website: waynebergeron.com

Wayne Bergeron (born January 16, 1958) is an American trumpeter.

Bergeron rose to prominence as a member of Maynard Ferguson's band in the 1980s. Since then, he has worked on over 500 TV and motion picture soundtracks. As a lead and studio player, he is notable both for his ability in the upper register of the instrument (as in his screaming trumpet work in the soundtrack for the 2004 Disney/Pixar animated movie The Incredibles) as well as his versatility (as in his cornet solo on the Final Jeopardy theme).

Bergeron is on faculty at the Los Angeles College of Music and is principal trumpet for the Pantages Theatre in Hollywood.

== Life and career ==
Bergeron was born in Hartford, Connecticut, and grew up in Los Angeles. His first instrument was the French horn, but he switched to the trumpet in his early teens due to his French horn being destroyed.

In 1986, he won the spot of lead trumpeter for Maynard Ferguson's band. He has recorded as a sideman for David Benoit, Rosemary Clooney, Neil Diamond, Julio Iglesias, and Jack Sheldon; he contributed to the movies Despicable Me, Dreamgirls, Frozen, Rounders, Superman Returns, The Incredibles, and Toy Story 3.

Bergeron has held the role of lead trumpet in Gordon Goodwin's Big Phat Band since the band was founded and has had two solo charts written for him: "Horn of Puente" from XXL and "Years of Therapy" from Life in the Bubble.

His debut album as a solo musician was You Call This a Living? (2002), featuring the "Friend Like Me" arranged by Bill Liston. The album also features fellow Maynard Ferguson alumnus Peter Erskine on drums and Big Phat Band alumnus Eric Marienthal on saxophone. His next album, Plays Well with Others (2007) received critical acclaim and was nominated for a Grammy Award. The album features Maynard Ferguson in one of his last performances on the track "Maynard & Waynard".

In 2013, Bergeron designed his own range of trumpet mouthpieces. He was initiated as National Honorary member of Phi Mu Alpha Sinfonia music fraternity and a Signature Sinfonian at the National Convention in New Orleans in 2015.

== Discography ==
=== As leader ===
- You Call This a Living? (Wag, 2002)
- Plays Well with Others (Concord Jazz, 2007)
- Full Circle (Wayne Bergeron, 2016)
- "Music and Mistletoe" (Wayne Bergeron and the After Hours Brass, 2012)

=== As sideman or guest ===
With Bill Elliott

- Swing Fever (Wayland, 1994)
- Calling All Jitterbugs! (Wayland, 1997)
- Swingin' the Century (Wayland, 1999)

With Michael Feinstein

- Big City Rhythms (Concord, 1999)
- The Sinatra Project (Concord, 2008)
- Sinatra Project Vol. II (Concord, 2011)

With Maynard Ferguson

- Body & Soul (BlackHawk, 1986)
- Big Bop Nouveau (Intima, 1990)
- Brass Attitude (Concord, 1998)

With Bob Florence

- Funupsmanship (MAMA, 1993)
- With All the Bells and Whistles (MAMA, 1995)
- Earth (MAMA, 1997)
- Serendipity 18 (MAMA, 1998)
- Whatever Bubbles Up (Summit, 2003)

With Gordon Goodwin's Big Phat Band

- Swingin' for the Fences (Silverline, 2000)
- XXL (Silverline, 2003)
- The Phat Pack (Immergent, 2006)
- Bah, Humduck! A Looney Tunes Christmas (soundtrack) (Immergent, 2006)
- Act Your Age (Immergent, 2008)
- That's How We Roll (Telarc, 2011)
- Life in the Bubble (Telarc, 2014)
- Wrap This! (Music of Content, 2015)
- The Gordian Knot (Music of Content, 2019)

With Tom Kubis

- Slightly Off the Ground (Sea Breeze, 1989)
- At Last (Cexton, 1992)
- It's Not Just for Christmas Anymore! (Cexton, 1995)
- Fast Cars & Fascinating Women (Sea Breeze, 1996)
- You Just Can't Have Enough Christmas! (Cexton, 1997)
- Keep Swingin' (Sea Breeze, 1997)
- A Jazz Musician's Christmas (Sea Breeze, 2002)
- Live and Unleashed at Don the Beachcomber (Tom Kubis, 2013)

With John LaBarbera

- On the Wild Side (Jazz Compass, 2003)
- Fantazm (Jazz Compass, 2005)
- Caravan (Jazz Compass, 2013)

With Frank Macchia

- Animals (Cacophony, 2004)
- Mo' Animals (Cacophony, 2006)
- Folk Songs for Jazzers (Cacophony, 2010)
- Son of Folk Songs for Jazzers (Cacophony, 2010)
- Frank Macchia's Swamp Thang (Cacophony, 2011)
- Fried Zombie Stew (Cacophony, 2012)
- Grease Mechanix (Cacophony, 2013)

With Barry Manilow

- Manilow Sings Sinatra (Arista, 1998)

With John Powell

- Mr. & Mrs. Smith (Recall, 2005)
- Ice Age: The Meltdown (Varese Sarabande, 2006)
- Dr. Seuss' Horton Hears a Who! (Varese Sarabande, 2008)

With Chris Walden

- Home of My Heart (Origin, 2005)
- No Bounds (Origin, 2006)
- Full-On! (Origin, 2014)

With Bill Watrous

- A Time for Love (GNP Crescendo, 1993)
- Space Available (Double-Time, 1997)
- Kindred Spirits (Summit, 2006)
- A Beautiful Friendship (Summit, 2014)

With Robbie Williams

- Swing When You're Winning (Chrysalis, 2001)
- Escapology (Chrysalis, 2002)
- Swings Both Ways (Island, 2013)

With Ralph Carmichael

- Strike Up the Band (Brentwood, 1994)

With others

- Ryan Adams, 29 (Lost Highway 2005)
- Adonia, Adonia Gospel Vol. 2 (Adonia, 2015)
- Christina Aguilera, My Kind of Christmas (RCA, BMG 2000)
- Christina Aguilera, Back to Basics (RCA, BMG 2006)
- Paul Anka, Classic Songs My Way (Universal, 2007)
- Paul Anka, Songs of December (Decca, 2012)
- Avenged Sevenfold, Avenged Sevenfold (Warner Bros., 2007)
- Tyler Bates, Watchmen (Reprise/Warner Sunset 2009)
- Christophe Beck, The Peanuts Movie (Fox, 2015)
- David Benoit, Shaken Not Stirred (GRP, 1994)
- David Benoit, Right Here, Right Now (GRP, 2003)
- Andrea Bocelli, Cinema (Sugar/Almud, 2015)
- Pat Boone, In a Metal Mood (Hip-O 1997)
- Buddy Bregman, It Don't Mean a Thing If It Ain't Got That Swing (Varese Sarabande, 1998)
- James Brown, Get On Up (Polydor, 2014)
- Michael Bublé, To Be Loved (Reprise, 2013)
- Luz Casal, La Pasion (Blue Note/EMI 2009)
- Matt Catingub, Gershwin 100 (Concord Jazz, 1998)
- Matt Catingub, I'm Getting Cement All Over You (Ewe) (Sea Breeze, 1991)
- Ray Charles, Genius Loves Company (2004)
- Ray Charles, Count Basie Orchestra, Ray Sings Basie Swings (Hear Music/Concord 2006)
- Rosemary Clooney, Dedicated to Nelson (Concord Jazz, 1996)
- Rosemary Clooney, White Christmas (Concord Jazz, 1996)
- Biffy Clyro, Only(2009)
- Joe Cocker, Have a Little Faith (Capitol, 1994)
- Natalie Cole, Still Unforgettable (ATCO, 2008)
- Harry Connick Jr., Your Songs (Columbia, 2009)
- Rick Cua, Within Reach (Reunion 1991)
- Brian Culbertson, A Soulful Christmas (GRP, 2006)
- Bob Curnow, The Music of Pat Metheny & Lyle Mays (MAMA, 1994)
- John Debney, Predators (La-La Land, 2010)
- John Debney, Ice Age Collision Course (Varese Sarabande, 2016)
- James Darren, This One's from the Heart (Concord Jazz, 1999)
- Alexandre Desplat, The Secret Life of Pets (Back Lot, 2016)
- Neil Diamond, Up on the Roof: Songs from the Brill Building (Columbia, 1993)
- Tim Draxl, Insongniac (Columbia, 2001)
- Earth, Wind & Fire, Holiday (Legacy, Sony 2014)
- Kyle Eastwood, From There to Here (Columbia, 1998)
- Eels, Daisies of the Galaxy (Bong Load, 2000)
- Eels, End Times (Cooperative, 2010)
- Lorraine Feather, Such Sweet Thunder (Sanctuary, 2003)
- Lorraine Feather, Dooji Wooji (Sanctuary, 2005)
- Dirk Fischer, George Stone, Coming of Age (Sea Breeze, 2010)
- Grant Geissman, Business As Usual (Positive Music 1995)
- Michael Giacchino, The Incredibles (Walt Disney, 2004)
- Michael Giacchino, Ratatouille (Walt Disney, 2007)
- Michael Giacchino, Coco (Walt Disney, 2017)
- Vince Gill, Breath of Heaven: A Christmas Collection (MCA Nashville 1998)
- Amy Grant, A Christmas to Remember (A&M, 1999)
- Marvin Hamlisch, The Informant! (New Line 2009)
- Jimmy Haslip, Nightfall (Vie 2010)
- Les Hooper, Anything Goes Plus (Hooperman 1005)
- James Newton Howard, Duplicity (Varese Sarabande, 2009)
- Justin Hurwitz, La La Land (Interscope, 2016)
- Justin Hurwitz, First Man (Back Lot/Universal, 2018)
- Julio Iglesias, Crazy (Columbia, 1994)
- INXS, Switch (Epic, 2005)
- Mark Isham, The Cooler (Koch, 2003)
- Henry Jackman, Ralph Spaccatutto (Walt Disney, 2012)
- Paul Jackson Jr., Lay It Back (Branch, 2008)
- Quincy Jones/Sammy Nestico, Basie & Beyond (Qwest, Warner Bros. 2000)
- Ron Kenoly, Welcome Home (Integrity Music, 1996)
- Dave Koz, The Dance (Capitol, 1999)
- Harald Kloser, The Day After Tomorrow (Varese Sarabande, 2004)
- Christopher Lennertz, Cats & Dogs: The Revenge of Kitty Galore (Varese Sarabande, 2010)
- Eric Marienthal, One Touch (GRP, 1993)
- The Mars Volta, Frances the Mute (2005)
- Andy Martin, Vic Lewis, The Project (Drewbone, 2004)
- Keiko Matsui, Echo (Avex Trax, 2019)
- Martina McBride, It's the Holiday Season (BMG 2018)
- Seth MacFarlane, Music Is Better Than Words (Universal/Republic, 2011)
- Seth MacFarlane, In Full Swing (Verve/Republic, 2017)
- Meat Loaf, Bat Out of Hell III (Mercury, 2006)
- Bette Midler, Bette Midler Sings the Rosemary Clooney Songbook (Columbia, 2003)
- Luis Miguel, Complices (Warner Music Latina, 2008)
- Buddy Miles, Sneak Attack (Atlantic, 1981)
- Michelle Nicastro, Reel Imagination (Varese Sarabande, 1994)
- Sammy Nestico, Big Band Favorites of Sammy Nestico (Summit, 1998)
- Sammy Nestico, This Is the Moment (Fenwood 2002)
- Jennifer Nettles, That Girl (Mercury Nashville 2014)
- Roger Neumann, Instant Heat! (Sea Breeze, 1994)
- Randy Newman, Dark Matter (Nonesuch, 2017)
- Thomas Newman, Finding Dory (Walt Disney, Pixar 2016)
- Anita O'Day, Rules of the Road (Pablo, 1993)
- Bill Perkins, Our Man Woody (Jazz Mark, 1991)
- Heitor Pereira, Minions (Back Lot, 2015)
- Gregory Porter, Nat King Cole & Me (Blue Note, 2017)
- Tito Puente, Special Delivery (Concord Jazz Picante, 1996)
- The Pussycat Dolls, Sway (A&M, 2004)
- The Pussycat Dolls, PCD (A&M, 2005)
- Trevor Rabin, G-Force (Walt Disney, 2009)
- Dianne Reeves, The Calling (Blue Note, 2001)
- Kim Richmond, Passages (Sea Breeze, 1992)
- Arturo Sandoval, Trumpet Evolution (Columbia, 2000)
- Arturo Sandoval, Dear Diz (Concord Jazz, 2012)
- Diane Schuur, Love Walked In (GRP, 1996)
- Marilyn Scott, Sky Dancing (Sin-Drome, 1991)
- Brian Setzer, Guitar Slinger (InsideOut, 1996)
- Jack Sheldon, Jack Is Back (Butterfly, 1995)
- Shinedown, Amaryllis (Atlantic, 2012)
- Manfred Siebald, Nicht Vergessen (Haenssler, 1998)
- Keely Smith, Keely Sings Sinatra (Concord Jazz, 2001)
- Spies, Music of Espionage (Telarc, 1988)
- Ruben Studdard, Unconditional Love (Verve, 2014)
- Tom Talbert, The Warm Cafe (Sea Breeze, 1993)
- Randy Waldman, Super Heroes (BFM Jazz, 2018)
- Russell Watson, That's Life (Decca, 2007)
- Lee Ann Womack, The Season for Romance (MCA Nashville, 2002)
- Patrick Williams, Sinatraland (EMI-Capitol, 1998)
- Brian Wilson, No Pier Pressure (Capitol, 2015)
- Weird Al Yankovic, Mandatory Fun (RCA, 2014)
- Neil Young, Storytone (Reprise, 2014)
- Lana Del Rey, Blue Banisters (Interscope Records and Polydor Records, 2021)
