= Nitro Burnin' Funny Daddy =

Studio album by Brian Setzer
- Released: October 20, 2003
- Recorded: 2003
- Studio: Unit A Studio, Palm Springs, California
- Genre: Rock; rockabilly
- Label: Surfdog
- Producer: Brian Setzer, Dave Darling

Brian Setzer chronology
Boogie Woogie Christmas (2002)	Nitro Burnin' Funny Daddy (2003)	Rockabilly Riot Vol. 1: A Tribute to Sun Records (2005)

Professional ratings
Review scores
Source	Rating
Allmusic	4/5 stars

Nitro Burnin' Funny Daddy is the eleventh solo album from American musician Brian Setzer, released in 2003 on Surfdog Records. He said, when released, that it was the most personal record he had ever done. He ventured away from his traditional "hot rod rockabilly side" and wrote more about love ("That Someone Just Ain't You"), faith ("St. Jude") and death ("Sixty Years").

== Track listing ==
All songs written by Brian Setzer, unless otherwise stated.

1. "Sixty Years" - 4:42
2. "Don't Trust a Woman (In a Black Cadillac)" - 3:46
3. "When The Bells Don't Chime" - 3:07
4. "That Someone Just Ain't You" - 3:55
5. "Rat Pack Boogie" - 4:21
6. "Ring, Ring, Ring" - 2:47
7. "Drink Whiskey and Shut Up" - 4:25
8. "Smokin' 'N Burnin'" - 4:25
9. "Wild Wind" (Terry Gilkyson) - 3:16
10. "St. Jude" - 4:28
11. "To Be Loved" (Ken Goodloe, Joe Jones, Carl McGinnis, Otis Munson, Ted Goodloe) - 2:22
12. "When The Bells Don't Chime" (Banjo Mix) - 3:07

== Personnel ==
- Brian Setzer - lead vocals, electric guitar, banjo
- Johnny Hatton - double bass
- Bernie Dresel - drums, percussion
- Joie Shettler, Julie Reiten - backing vocals

Technical

- Jeff Peters - engineer
- Chris Lord-Alge - mixing
- William Hames - cover photography
