= The Phat Pack =

Studio album by Gordon Goodwin's Big Phat Band
- Released: June 13, 2006
- Studio: Capitol Records and Conway Studios, Hollywood, California; O'Henry Studios, Burbank; Rimrock Studios, Thousand Oaks; Vertical Sound, Nashville, Tennessee
- Genre: Jazz, big band
- Length: 75:05
- Label: Immergent
- Producer: Gordon Goodwin, Evan Johnson, Dan Savant, David Tedds

Gordon Goodwin's Big Phat Band chronology
XXL (2003)	The Phat Pack (2006)	Act Your Age (2008)

The Phat Pack is the third studio album by the jazz ensemble Gordon Goodwin's Big Phat Band. Goodwin received a Grammy Award nomination for Best Instrumental Arrangement for the song "Attack of the Killer Tomatoes".

The title is a parody of the Rat Pack, a group of friends and performers during the 1960s which included Frank Sinatra and Sammy Davis Jr. Goodwin arranged cover versions of two songs that were associated with the Rat Pack, "Too Close for Comfort" and "It Was a Very Good Year", and a hit from the 1970s, "Play That Funky Music".

Soloists include Wayne Bergeron, Eddie Daniels, Eric Marienthal, Andy Martin, David Sanborn, Bob Summers, and the vocal group Take 6.

== Track listing ==
All tracks are written by Gordon Goodwin except where noted.

No.	Title	Writer(s)	Length
1.	"Cut 'n' Run"		6:07
2.	"Too Close for Comfort"	Larry Holofcener, George David Weiss	3:39
3.	"Count Bubba's Revenge"		6:36
4.	"Play That Funky Music"	Rob Parissi	6:13
5.	"The Phat Pack"		6:39
6.	"Hunting Wabbits 2 (A Bad Hare Day)"		4:47
7.	"La Almeja Pequena (The Little Clam)"		7:36
8.	"Get in Line"		6:53
9.	"Attack of the Killer Tomatoes"		5:09
10.	"Under the Wire"		5:30
11.	"Whodunnit?"		6:28
12.	"It Was a Very Good Year"	Ervin Drake	5:20
13.	"Ever Braver, Ever Stronger (An American Elegy)"		4:08

Source: AllMusic

== Personnel ==
- Gordon Goodwin – tenor saxophone, piano, arranger
- Dan Savant – trumpet
- Wayne Bergeron – trumpet
- Daniel Fornero – trumpet
- Alex Iles – trombone
- Andy Martin – trombone
- Charlie Morillas – trombone
- Craig Gosnell – trombone
- Craig Ware – trombone
- Eric Marienthal – flute, alto saxophone, soprano saxophone
- Sal Lozano – flute, alto saxophone, piccolo
- David Sanborn – saxophone
- Eddie Daniels – clarinet
- Jeff Driskill – clarinet, tenor saxophone
- Brian Scanlon – clarinet, tenor saxophone
- Jay Mason – bass clarinet, baritone saxophone
- Grant Geissman – guitar
- Carl Verheyen – guitar
- Ray Brinker – drums
- Bernie Dresel – drums
- Rick Shaw - Acoustic bass, electric bass
- Luis Conte – percussion
- Brad Dutz – percussion
- Dianne Reeves – vocals
- Take 6 – vocals

Production

- Gordon Goodwin – producer
- Evan Johnson – producer
- Dan Savant – producer
- David K. Tedds – producer
- John Trickett – executive producer
- Bernie Grundman – mastering
- Tommy Vicari – engineer, mixing
