= Dig That Crazy Christmas =

Studio album by The Brian Setzer Orchestra
- Released: October 25, 2005
- Length: 44:26
- Label: Surfdog
- Producer: Dave Darling

The Brian Setzer Orchestra chronology
The Ultimate Collection (2004)	Dig That Crazy Christmas (2005)	Wolfgang's Big Night Out (2007)

Professional ratings
Review scores
Source	Rating
Allmusic	3/5 stars

Dig That Crazy Christmas is the second Christmas album by The Brian Setzer Orchestra. Released in 2005 on Surfdog Records, it is a collection of holiday songs performed in big band swing style. Although most of the songs have been previously recorded by other artists, it includes two originals written by Setzer. This album follows up his 2002 Christmas release, Boogie Woogie Christmas.

== Track listing ==
1. "Dig That Crazy Santa Claus" – 2:14 (Albert Johnston Jr., Leon René, Rafael René)
2. "Angels We Have Heard on High" – 4:21 (traditional)
3. "Gettin' in the Mood (For Christmas)" – 3:34 (Joseph C. Garland, Michael Himmelstein, Brian Setzer)
4. "White Christmas" – 5:22 (Irving Berlin)
5. "Let It Snow! Let It Snow! Let It Snow!" – 2:08 (Sammy Cahn, Jule Styne)
6. "'Zat You Santa Claus?" – 3:13 (Jack Fox)
7. "Hey Santa!" – 4:08 (Setzer)
8. "My Favorite Things" – 3:59 (Oscar Hammerstein II, Richard Rodgers)
9. "You're a Mean One, Mr. Grinch" – 2:38 (Theodor Geisel, Albert Hague)
10. "Cool Yule" – 2:35 (Steve Allen, Eric Kornfeld)
11. "Jingle Bell Rock" – 2:36 (Joe Beal, Jim Boothe)
12. "Santa Drives a Hot Rod" – 4:05 (Setzer)
13. "What Are You Doing New Year's Eve" – 3:33 (Frank Loesser)

== Personnel ==
- Brian Setzer - guitar, vocals
- Chris Lord-Alge - mixing
- John Holbrook - mixing
- Julie Reiten - vocals
- Mark Anthony Jones - arranger
- Kevin Norton - rap
- Nola Schoder - production co-ordination

== Charts ==
Chart (2005)	Peak position
US Billboard 200	56
US Top Holiday Albums (Billboard)	4
