= Presents Monk'estra, Volume 1 =

Studio album by John Beasley
- Released: 2016
- Genre: Jazz
- Label: Mack Avenue

John Beasley chronology
3 Brave Souls (2012)	Presents Monk'estra, Volume 1 (2016)

Presents Monk'estra, Volume 1 is an album by John Beasley. It earned Beasley a Grammy Award nomination for Best Large Jazz Ensemble Album.
