= Grammy Award for Best Large Jazz Ensemble Album =

Grammy Award

- Awarded for: quality large jazz ensemble albums
- Country: United States
- Presented by: National Academy of Recording Arts and Sciences
- First award: 1961
- Currently held by: Dan Pugach Big Band – Bianca Reimagined: Music For Paws And Persistence (2025)
- Website: grammy.com

The Grammy Award for Best Large Jazz Ensemble Album has been presented since 1961. From 1962 to 1971 and 1979 to 1991, the award title specified instrumental performances. Years reflect the year in which the Grammy Awards were presented for works released in the previous year.

== Name changes ==
The name of the award has been changed several times.

- 1961: Best Jazz Performance Large Group
- 1962–1963: Best Jazz Performance – Large Group (Instrumental)
- 1964: Best Instrumental Jazz Performance – Large Group
- 1965–1971: Best Instrumental Jazz Performance – Large Group or Soloist with Large Group
- 1972–1978: Best Jazz Performance by a Big Band
- 1979–1991: Best Jazz Instrumental Performance, Big Band
- 1992–2000: Best Large Jazz Ensemble Performance
- 2001–present: Best Large Jazz Ensemble Album

== Recipients ==
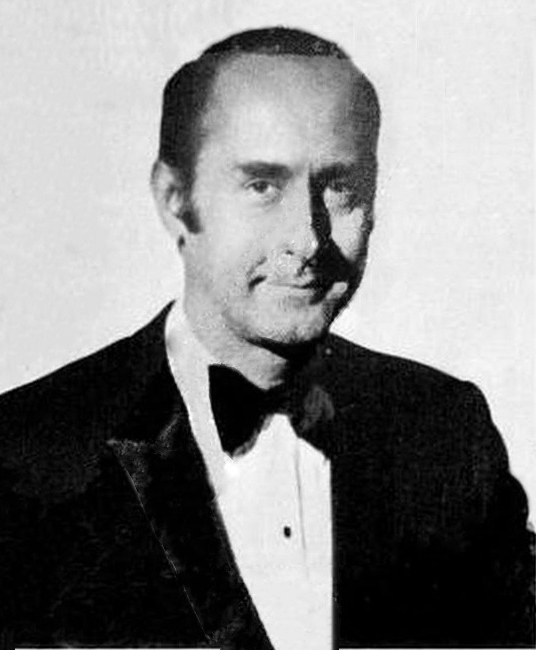
1961 winner Henry Mancini.

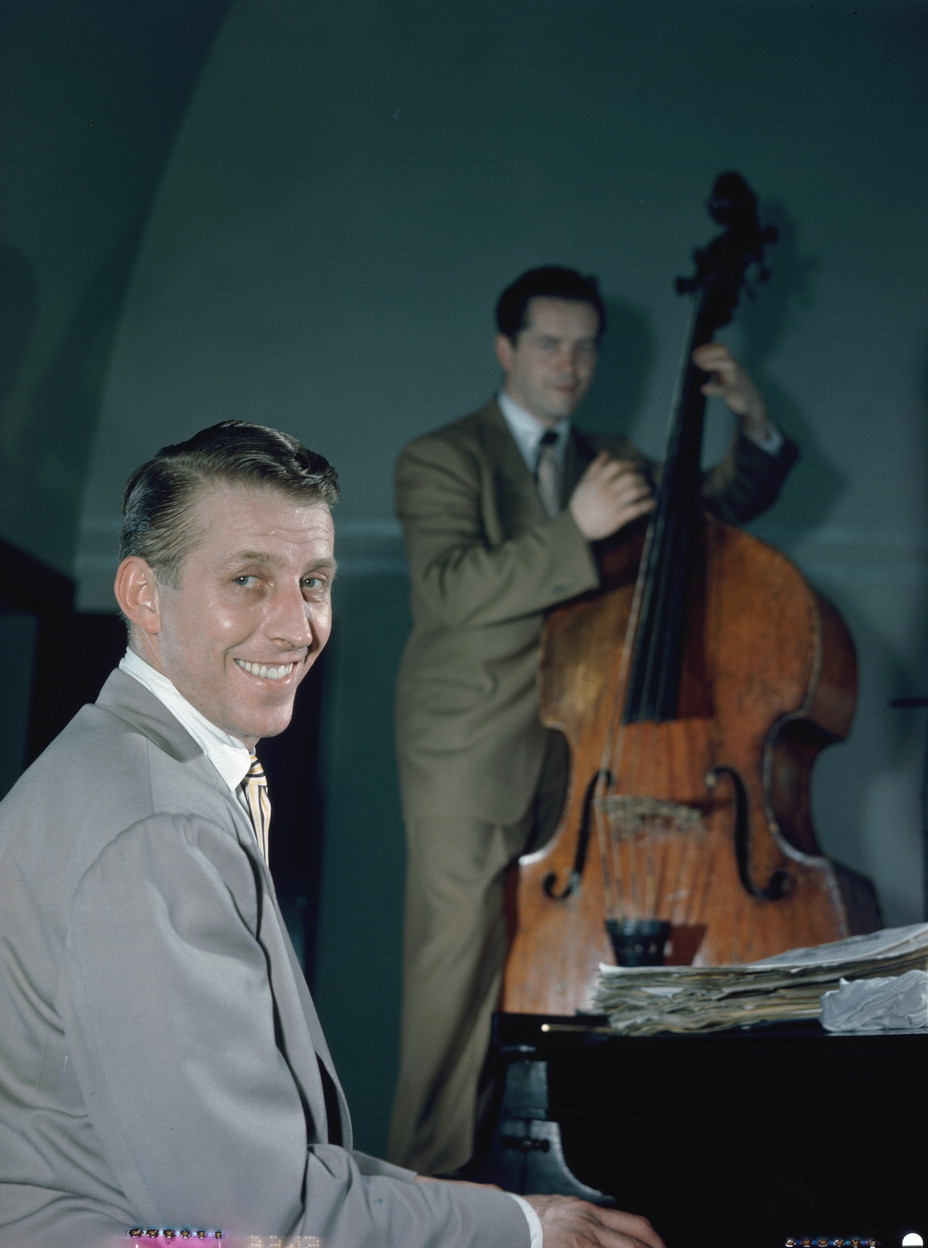
Two-time winner Stan Kenton (left).

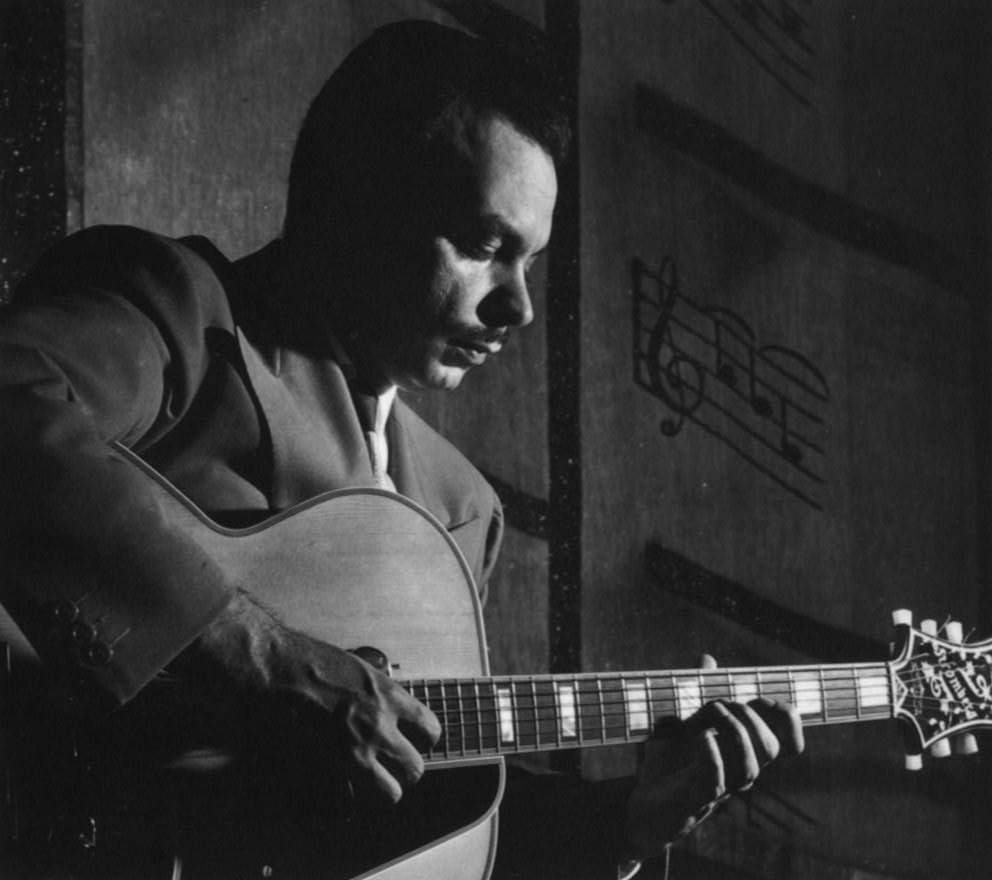
1965 winner Laurindo Almeida.

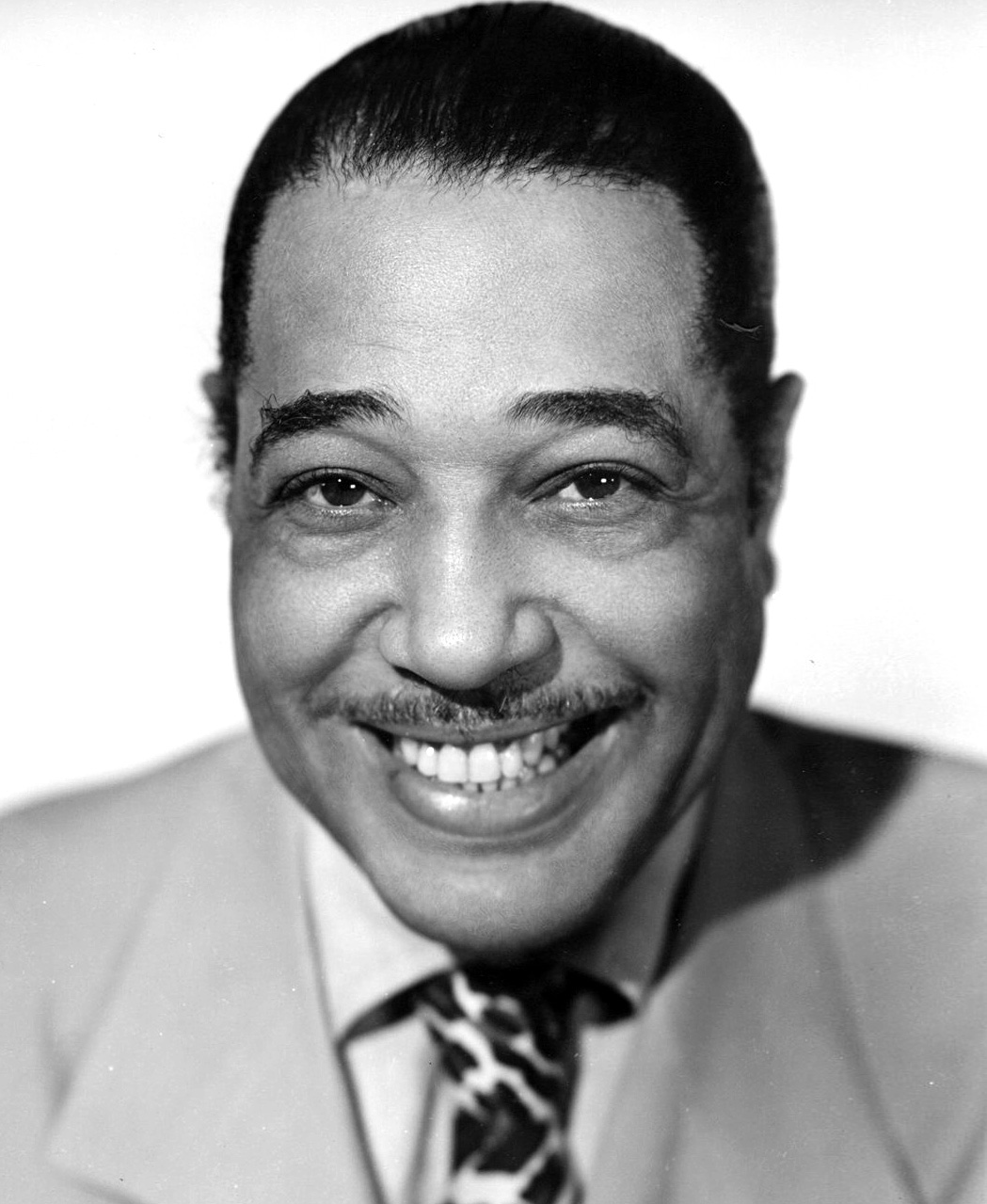
Seven-time winner Duke Ellington.

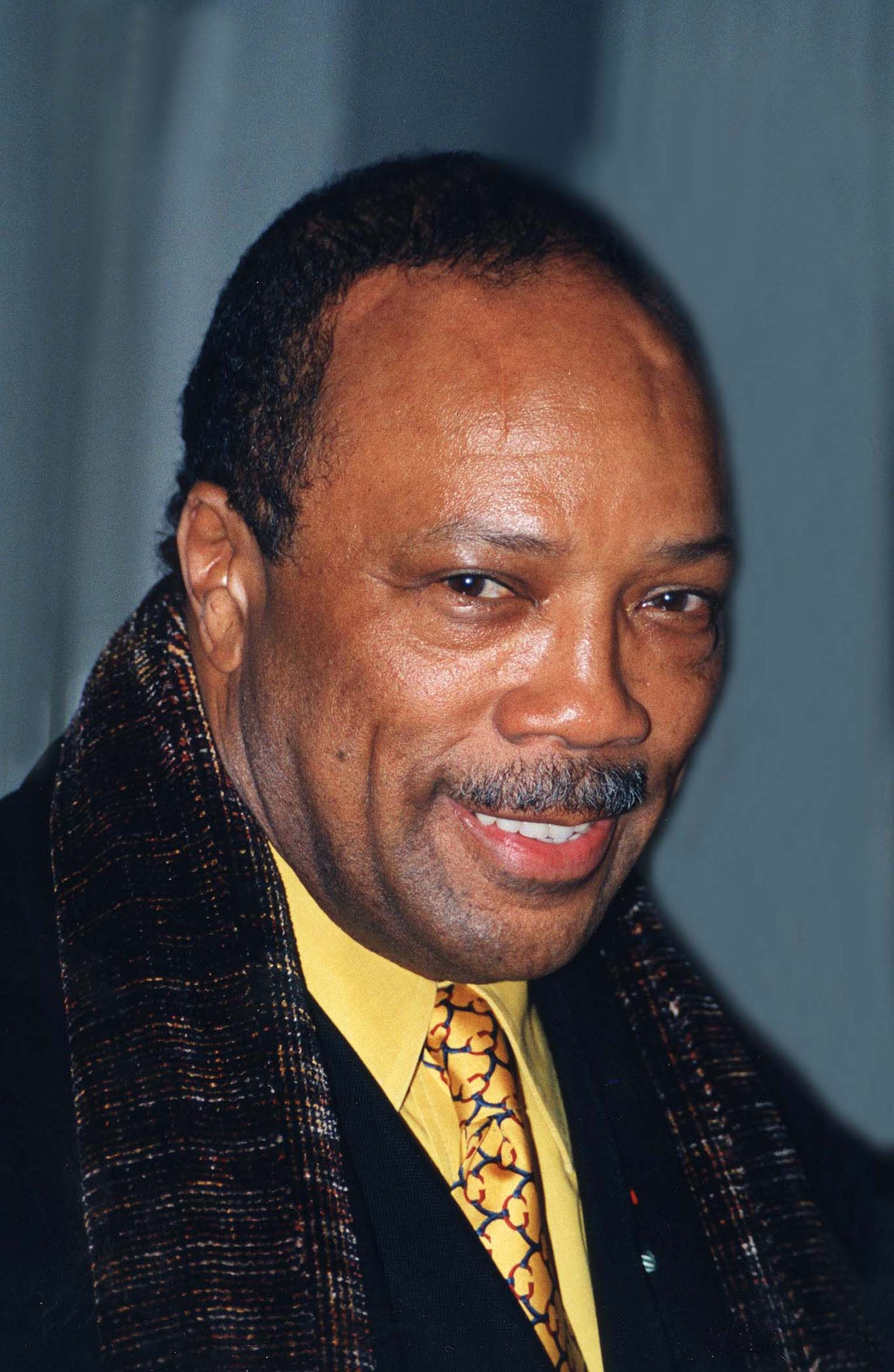
Two-time winner Quincy Jones.

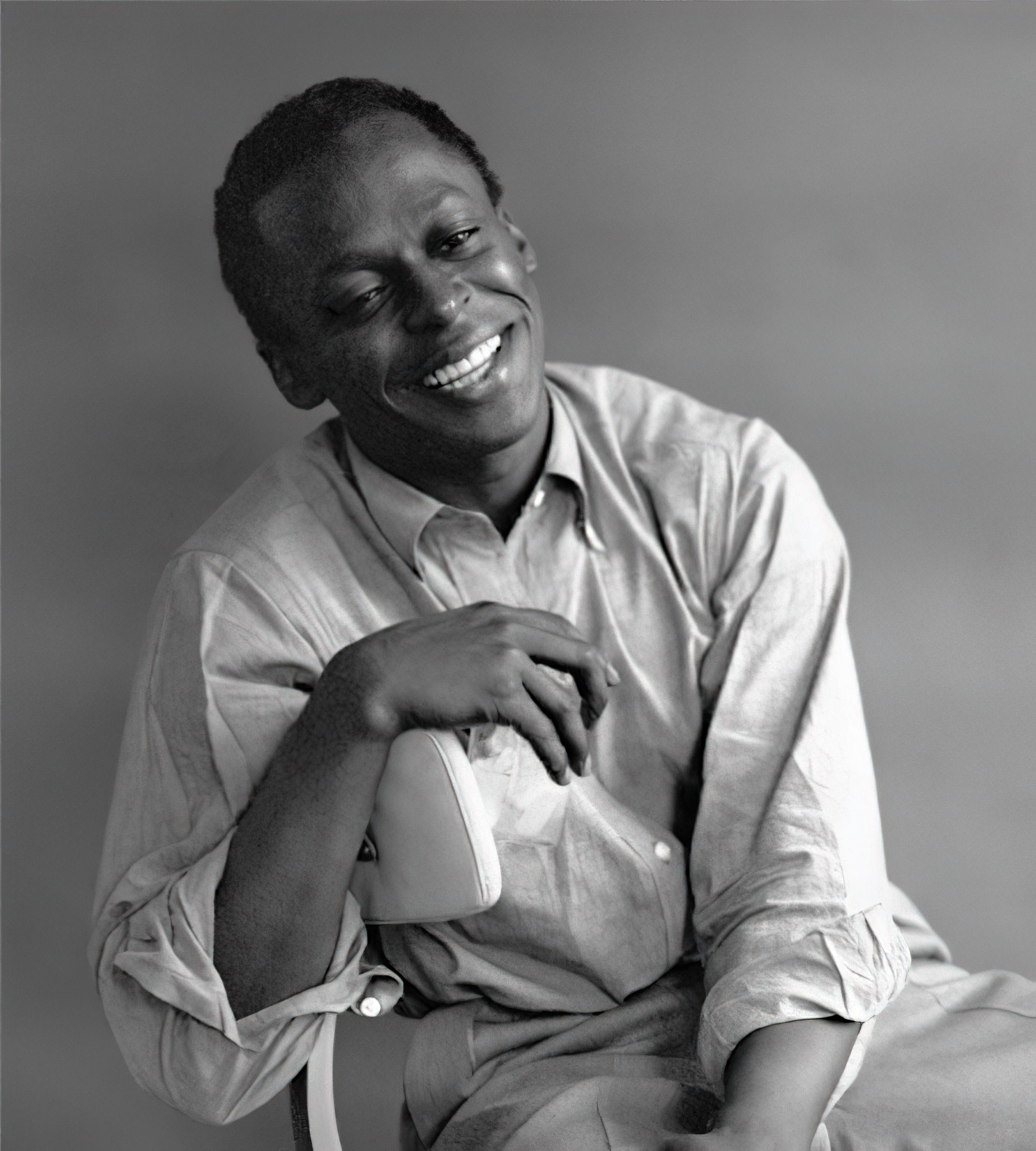
Three-time winner Miles Davis.

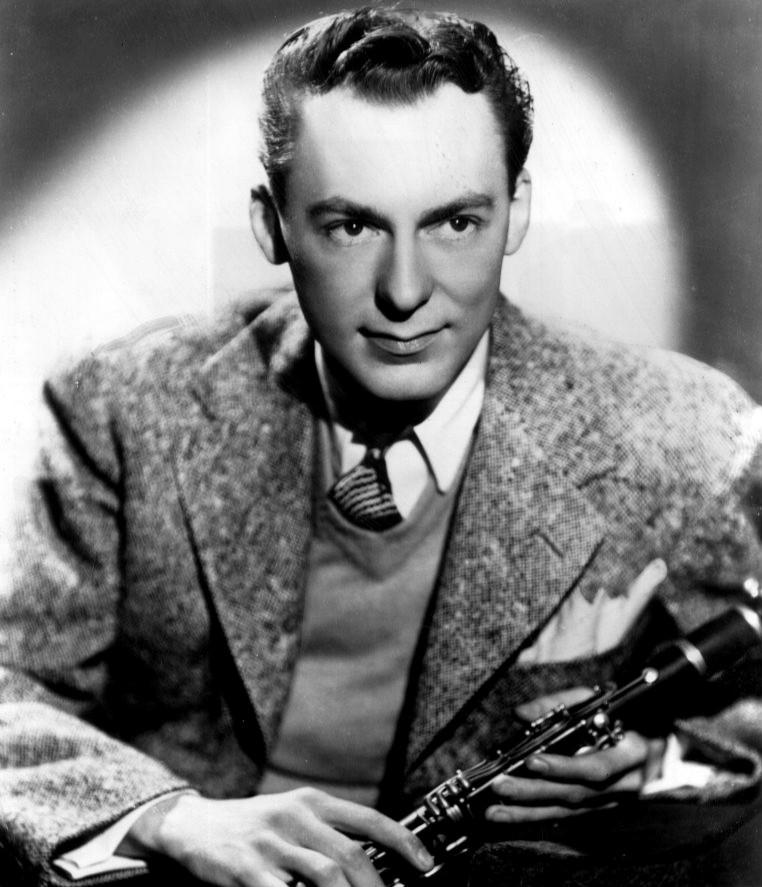
Three-time winner Woody Herman.

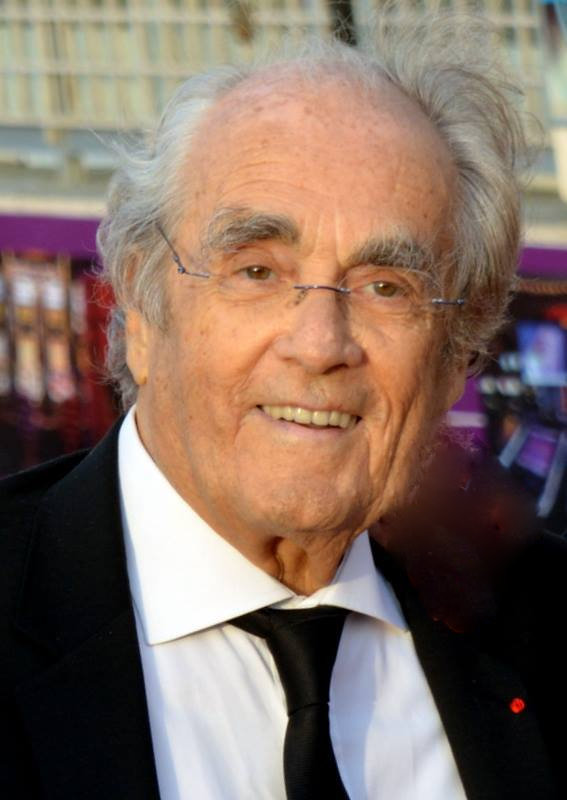
1976 award-winner Michel Legrand.

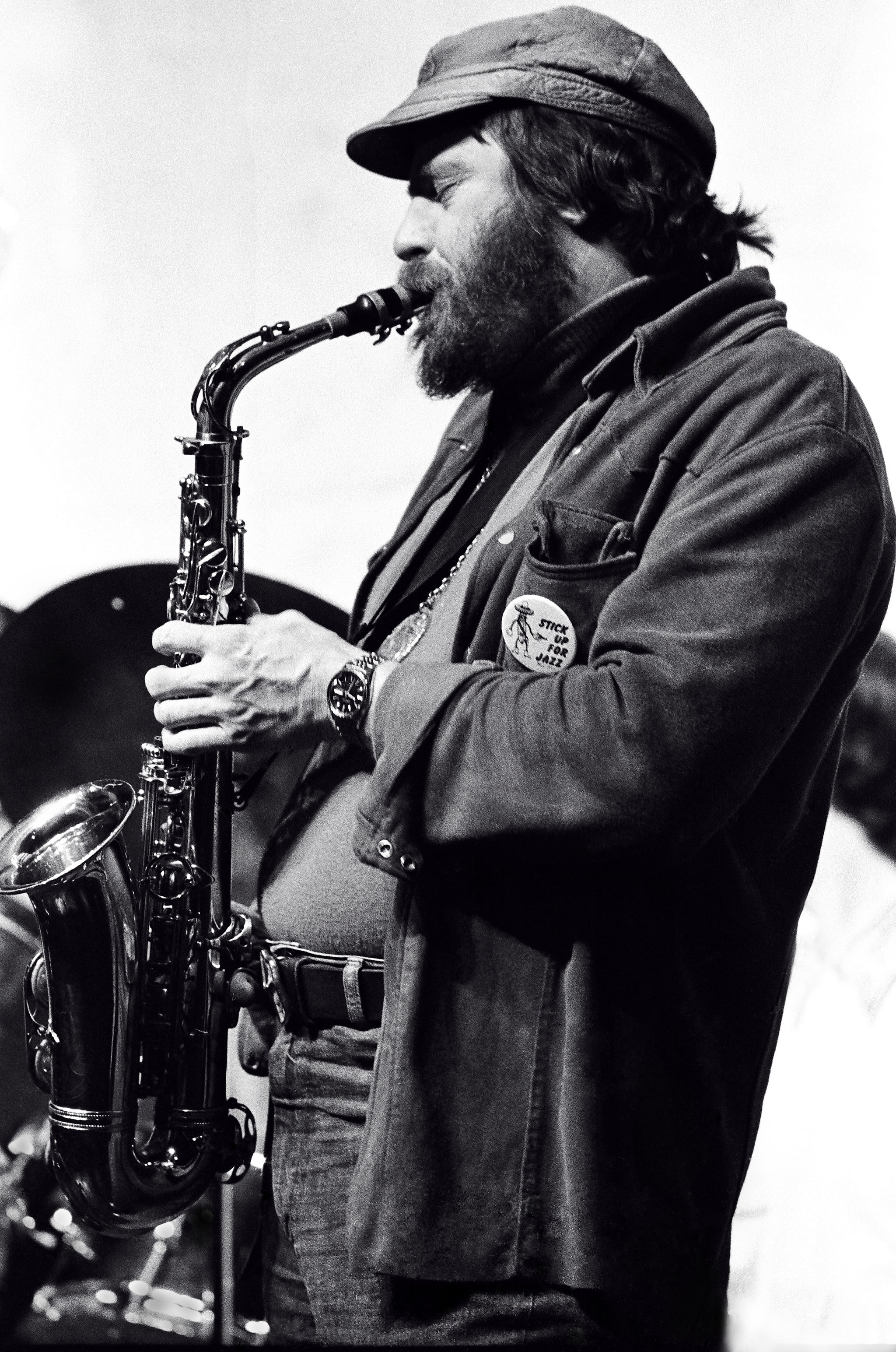
1976 award-winner Phil Woods.

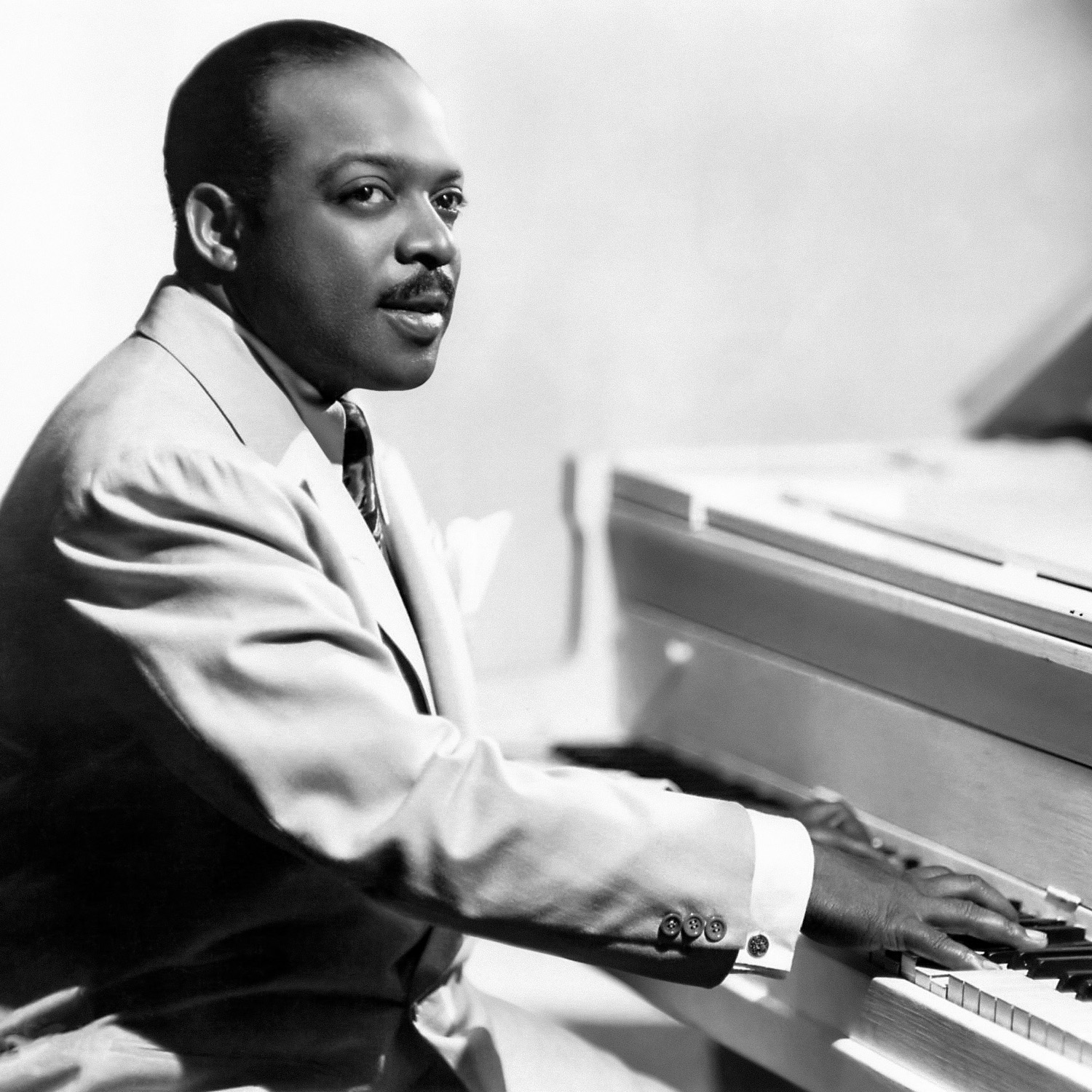
Five-time winner Count Basie.

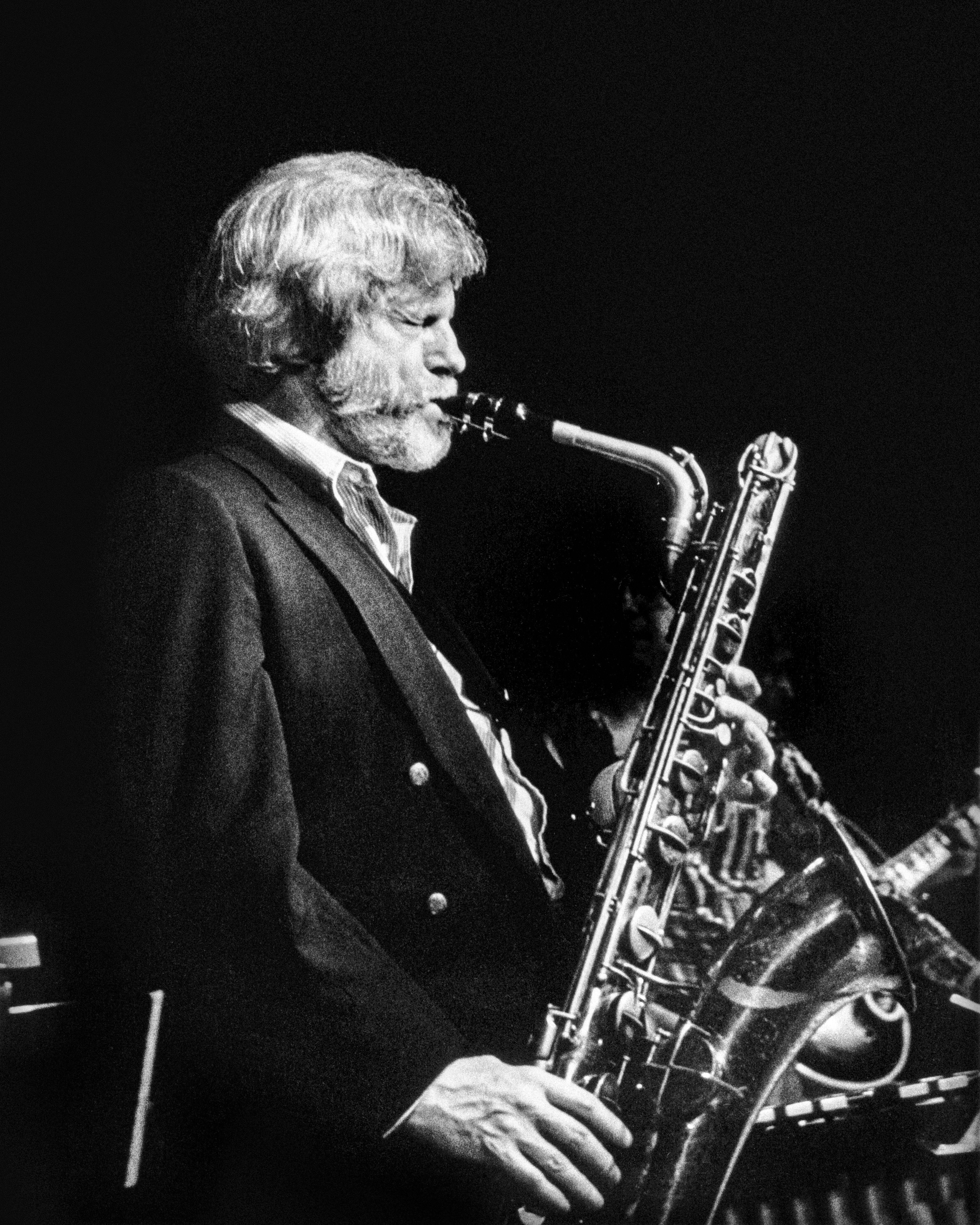
1982 winner Gerry Mulligan.

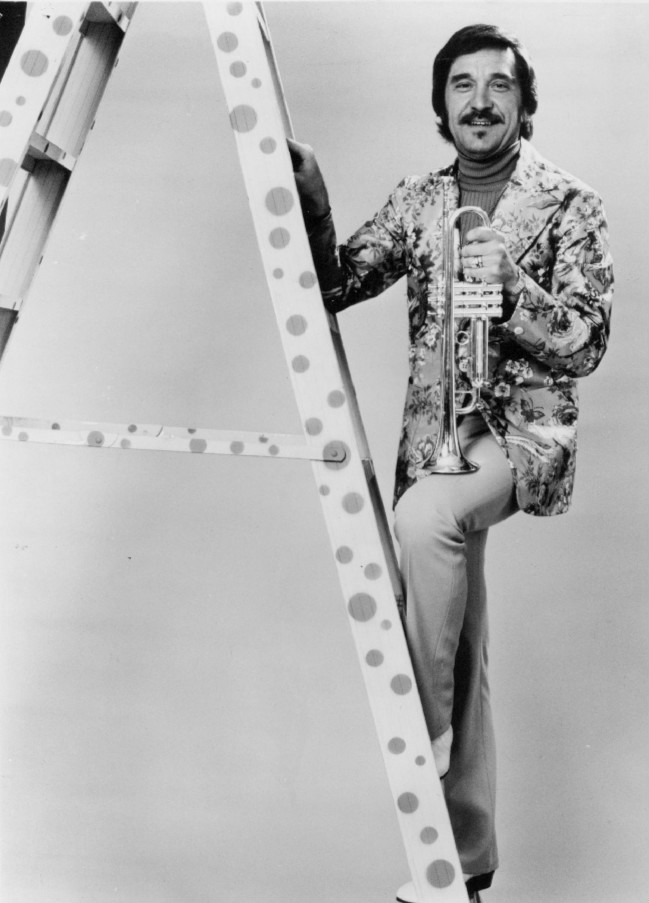
1987 winner Doc Severinsen.

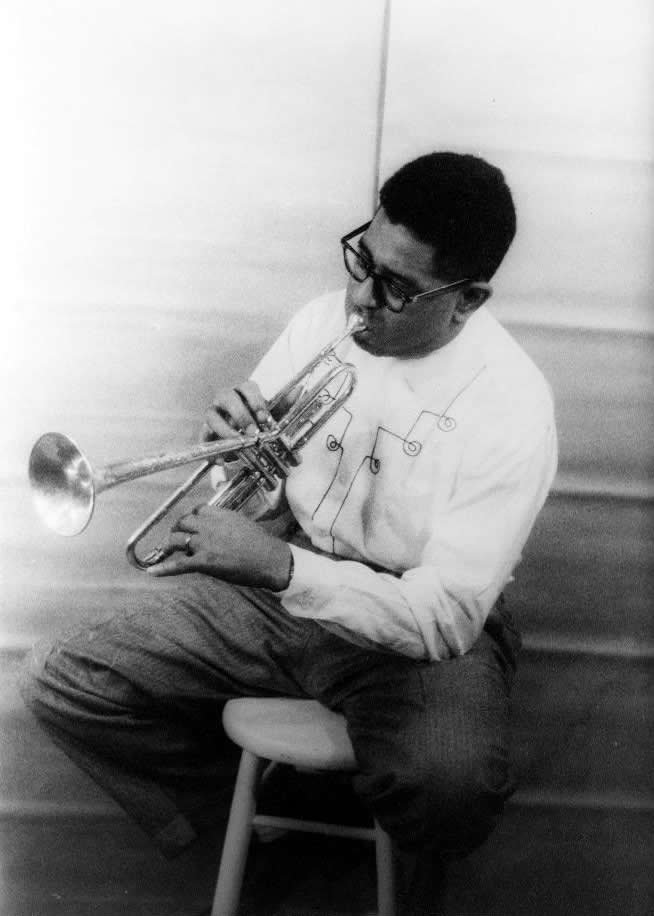
1992 winner Dizzy Gillespie.

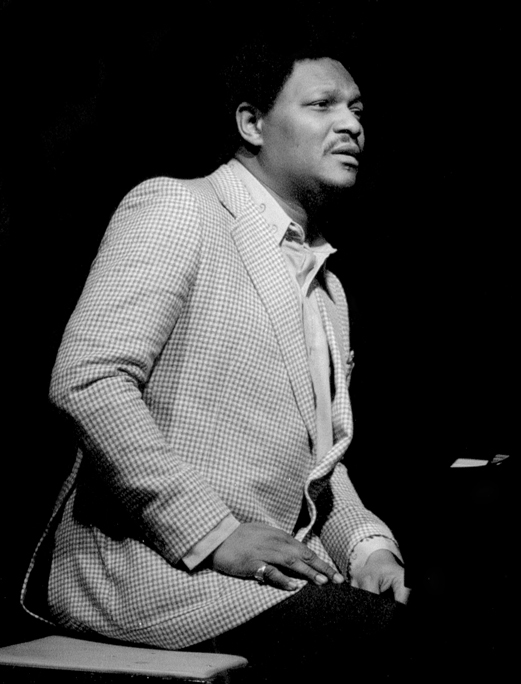
Two-time winner McCoy Tyner.

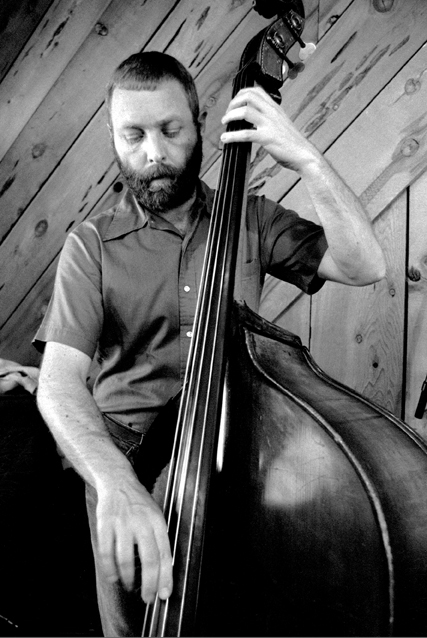
Two-time winner Dave Holland.

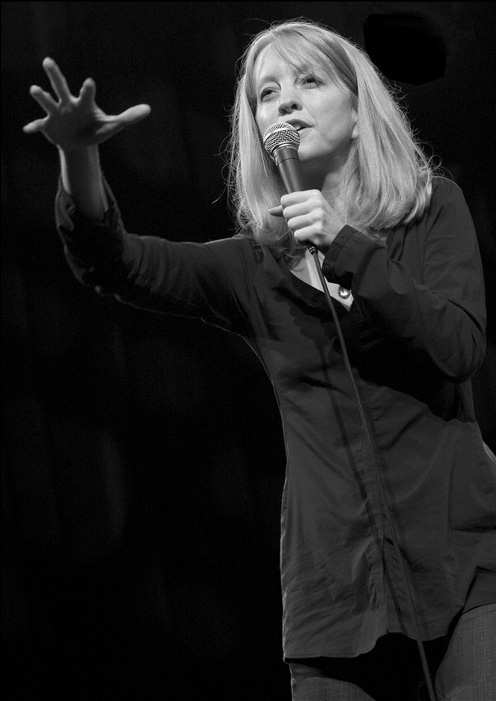
Three-time winner Maria Schneider.

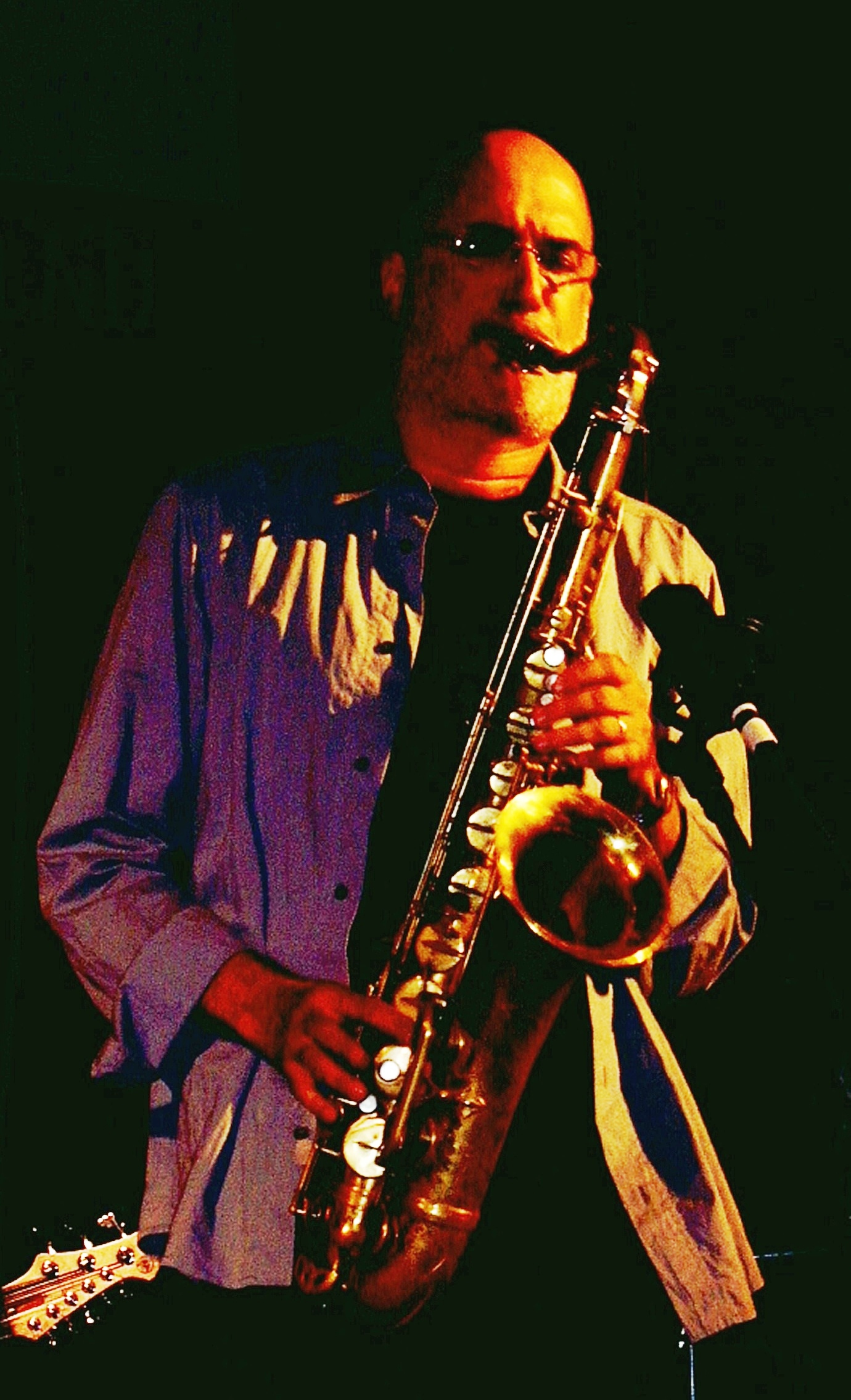
Two-time winner Michael Brecker.

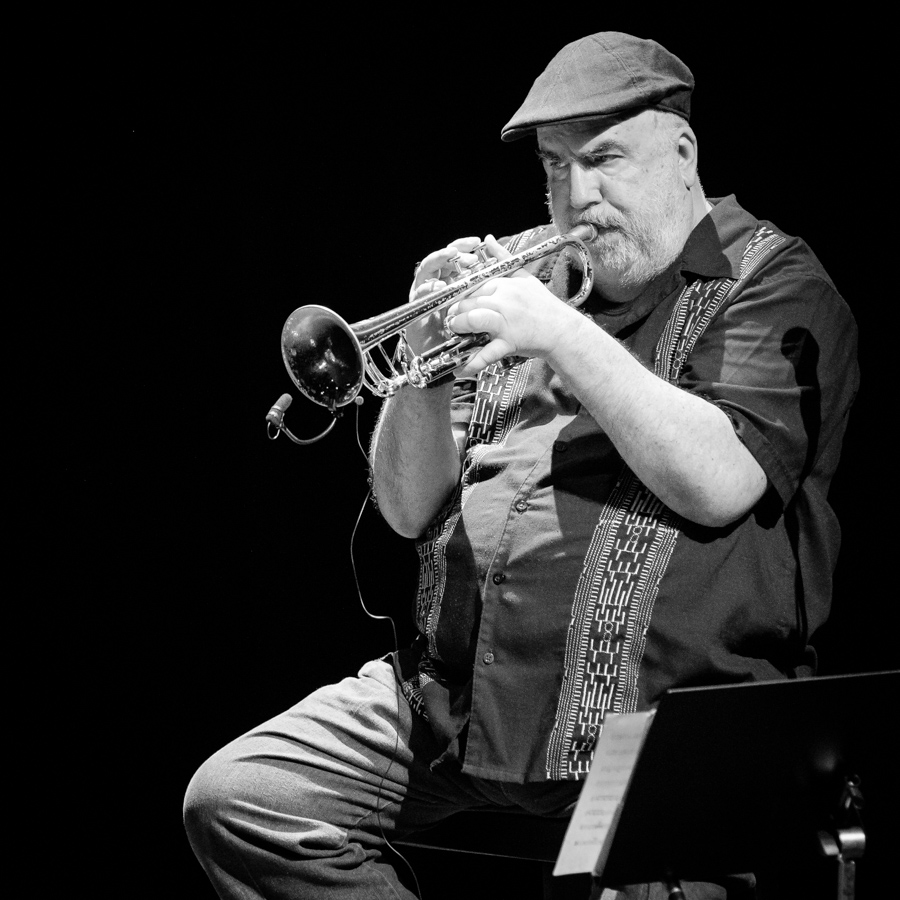
Two-time winner Randy Brecker.

Year^{[I]}	Performing artist(s)	Work	Nominees	Ref.
1961	Henry Mancini	The Blues and the Beat	Quincy Jones – The Great Wide World of Quincy Jones; Count Basie – The Count Basie Story; Miles Davis and Giles Evans – Sketches of Spain; Gerry Mulligan – "I'm Gonna Go Fishin'"	
1962	Stan Kenton	Kenton's West Side Story	Gil Evans – Out of the Cool; Dizzy Gillespie – Gillespiana; Count Basie Orchestra – Basie at Birdland; Andre Previn – "A Touch of Elegance"	
1963	Stan Kenton	Adventures in Jazz	Jimmy Smith – Walk on the Wild Side; Count Basie – The Legend; Miles Davis and Gil Evans – Miles Davis at Carnegie Hall; Count Basie Orchestra and Duke Ellington Orchestra – First Time!; Dizzy Gillespie – Carnegie Hall Concert; Gary McFarland and Stan Getz – Big Band Bossa Nova	
1964	Woody Herman	Encore: Woody Herman, 1963	Miles Davis – Seven Steps to Heaven; Quincy Jones – Quincy Jones Plays Hip Hits; Al Hirt – Our Man in New Orleans; Gerry Mulligan Concert Jazz Band – Gerry Mulligan '63; Oliver Nelson Orchestra – Full Nelson	
1965	Laurindo Almeida	Guitar from Ipanema	Woody Herman – Woody Herman '64; Gil Evans – The Individualism of Gil Evans; Rod Levitt – The Dynamic Sound Patterns of the Rod Levitt Orchestra; Quincy Jones – Quincy Jones Explores the Music of Henry Mancini; Miles Davis and Gil Evans Orchestra – Quiet Nights; Oscar Peterson and Nelson Riddle – Oscar Peterson and Nelson Riddle; Shelly Manne – My Fair Lady with the Un-original Cast	
1966	Duke Ellington	Ellington '66	Stan Getz – Mickey One; Dizzy Gillespie, Gil Fuller Conducting Monterey Jazz Festival Orchestra – Love Theme from The Sandpiper; Kenny Burrell and Gil Evans Orchestra – Guitar Forms; Paul Horn – Jazz Suite on the Mass Texts; Rod Levitt – Insight; Wes Montgomery with String Orchestra – Bumpin'	
1967	Not awarded			
1968	Duke Ellington	The Far East Suite	Woody Herman – Woody Live -- East and West; Thad Jones and Mel Lewis – Live at the Village Vanguard; Don Ellis Big Band – Live at Monterey; Buddy Rich – Big Swing Face	
1969	Duke Ellington	...And His Mother Called Him Bill	Erroll Garner – Up In Erroll's Room; Buddy Rich Big Band – Mercy, Mercy (Recorded Live at Caesars Palace); Don Ellis Big Band – Electric Bath; Wes Montgomery – Down Here on the Ground; Woody Herman – Concerto for Herd	
1970	Quincy Jones	Walking in Space	Don Ellis Big Band – The New Don Ellis Band Goes Underground; Bob Wilber – The Music of Hoagy Carmichael; Count Basie – Standing Ovation; Woody Herman – Light My Fire; Thad Jones and Mel Lewis – Central Park North; Buddy Rich Orchestra – Buddy & Soul; Gary McFarland – America the Beautiful	
1971	Miles Davis	Bitches Brew	Johnny Hodges – Three Shades of Blue; World's Greatest Jazz Band – Live at The Roosevelt Grill; Quincy Jones – Gula Matari; Duke Ellington – Duke Ellington - 70th Birthday Concert; Don Ellis Big Band – Don Ellis at Fillmore; Thad Jones and Mel Lewis – Consummation; Paul Desmond – Bridge Over Troubled Water	
1972	Duke Ellington	New Orleans Suite	Woody Herman – Woody; Maynard Ferguson – M.F. Horn; Count Basie – Afrique; Buddy Rich – A Different Drummer	
1973	Duke Ellington	Togo Brava Suite	Gerry Mulligan – The Age of Steam; Maynard Ferguson – M.F. Horn Two; Don Ellis Big Band – Connection; Kenny Clarke Francy Boland Big Band – All Smiles	
1974	Woody Herman	Giant Steps	Randy Weston – Tanjah; Oliver Nelson – Swiss Suite; Gil Evans – Svengali; Don Ellis – Soaring	
1975	Woody Herman	Thundering Herd	Patrick Williams – Threshold; Les Hooper – Look What They've Done; Chuck Mangione – Land of Make Believe; Don Sebesky – Giant Box	
1976	Michel Legrand & Phil Woods	Images	Bill Watrous and the Manhattan Wildlife Refuge – The Tiger of San Pedro; Thad Jones and Mel Lewis – Potpourri; Leon Breeden directing North Texas State University Lab Band – Lab '75; Clark Terry – Clark Terry's Big-B-A-D Band Live at The Wichita Jazz Festival	
1977	Duke Ellington	The Ellington Suites	Phil Woods – The New Phil Woods Album; Thad Jones and Mel Lewis – New Life; Toshiko Akiyoshi and Lew Tabackin Big Band – Long Yellow Road; Dizzy Gillespie and Machito – Afro-Cuban Jazz Moods	
1978	Count Basie	Prime Time	Woody Herman – The 40th Anniversary, Carnegie Hall Concert; Toshiko Akiyoshi and Lew Tabackin Big Band – Road Time; Leon Breeden directing The North Texas State University Lab Band – Lab '76; Buddy Rich – Buddy Rich Plays and Plays and Plays	
1979	The Thad Jones/Mel Lewis Orchestra	Live in Munich	Thad Jones – Thad Jones Greetings and Salutations; Dexter Gordon – Sophisticated Giant; Toshiko Akiyoshi and Lew Tabackin Big Band – Insights; Rob McConnell and the Boss Brass – Big Band Jazz	
1980	Duke Ellington	Duke Ellington at Fargo, 1940 Live	Louis Bellson & The Explosion – Note Smoking; Mel Lewis, Thad Jones and Umo – Thad Jones, Mel Lewis and UMO; Mel Lewis and The Jazz Orchestra – Naturally; Toshiko Akiyoshi and Lew Tabackin Big Band – Kogun	
1981	Count Basie	On the Road	Rob McConnell and The Boss Brass – Present Perfect; Bob Florence Big Band – Live at Concerts by the Sea; Toshiko Akiyoshi and Lew Tabackin Big Band – Farewell; Louis Bellson Big Band – Dynamite; Mel Lewis and The Jazz Orchestra – Bob Brookmeyer Composer/Arranger	
1982	Gerry Mulligan	Walk on the Water	Rob McConnell and The Boss Brass – Tribute; Toshiko Akiyoshi and Lew Tabackin Big Band – Tanuki's Night Out; Panama Francis and The Savoy Sultans – Panama Francis and The Savoy Sultans - Vol. II; Don Menza and His 80's Big Band – "Burnin' (Blues for Bird)"	
1983	Count Basie	Warm Breeze	Bob Florence Big Band – Westlake; Woody Herman Band – Live at The Concord Jazz Festival 1981; Mel Lewis and The Jazz Orchestra – Make Me Smile and Other New Works by Bob Brookmeyer; Rob McConnell and The Boss Brass – Live in Digital	
1984	Rob McConnell	All in Good Time	Louis Bellson – The London Gig; Bob Florence – Soaring; Gil Evans – Priestess; Count Basie – Farmer's Market Barbecue	
1985	Count Basie	88 Basie Street	Woody Herman Big Band – World Class; Toshiko Akiyoshi Jazz Orchestra – Ten Gallon Shuffle; The Carla Bley Band – Misterioso; The Bob Florence Limited Edition – Magic Time	
1986	Bob Wilber & John Barry	The Cotton Club	George Russell and The Living Time Orchestra – The African Game; Toshiko Akiyoshi and Lew Tabackin Big Band – March of the Tadpoles; Louis Bellson – Don't Stop Now!; Lionel Hampton – Ambassador at Large	
1987	Doc Severinsen	The Tonight Show Band with Doc Severinsen	Lionel Hampton and His Orchestra – Sentimental Journey; Benny Goodman and His Orchestra – Let's Dance; Woody Herman and His Band – 50th Anniversary Tour; Mel Lewis – 20 Years at The Village Vanguard	
1988	Mercer Ellington	Digital Duke	Woody Herman and His Big Band – Woody's Gold Star; The Tonight Show Band with Doc Severinsen – The Tonight Show Band with Doc Severinsen, Volume II; Louis Bellson and His Jazz Orchestra – Louis Bellson and His Jazz Orchestra; Patrick Williams – 10th Avenue	
1989	Gil Evans	Bud and Bird	The Gene Harris All Star Big Band – Tribute to Count Basie; Illinois Jacquet and His Big Band – Jacquet's Got It!; Richard Stoltzman – Ebony; Bill Holman – Bill Holman Band	
1990	Miles Davis	Aura	McCoy Tyner Big Band – Uptown/Downtown; The Count Basie Orchestra directed by Frank Foster – The Legend, The Legacy; Mel Lewis Jazz Orchestra – The Definitive Thad Jones; The Duke Ellington Orchestra conducted by Mercer Ellington – Music is My Mistress	
1991	Frank Foster	"Basie's Bag"	Bob Florence – Treasure Chest; Mel Lewis – The Definitive Thad Jones (Volume 2: Live from the Village Vanguard); Lionel Hampton – Cookin' in the Kitchen; Louis Bellson and His Jazz Orchestra – Airmail Special	
1992	Dizzy Gillespie	Live at the Royal Festival Hall	Rob McConnell and The Boss Brass – The Brass is Back; Jay McShann – Paris All-Star Blues (A Tribute to Charlie Parker); Doc Severinsen and The Tonight Show Band – Once More with Feeling; Charlie Haden – Dream Keeper; Bob Mintzer – Art of the Big Band	
1993	McCoy Tyner	The Turning Point	Benny Carter Big Band and The Rutgers University Orchestra – Harlem Renaissance; GRP All-Star Big Band – GRP All-Star Big Band; Toshiko Akiyoshi Jazz Orchestra – Carnegie Hall Concert; Rob McConnell and The Boss Brass – Brassy and Sassy	
1994	Miles Davis & Quincy Jones	Miles & Quincy Live at Montreux	Johnny Otis and His Orchestra – Spirit of the Black Territory Bands; Rob McConnell and The Boss Brass – Our 25th Year; Jimmy Heath – Little Man, Big Band; Tom Scott conducting The GRP All-Star Big Band – Dave Grusin Presents GRP All-Star Big Band Live!	
1995	McCoy Tyner	Journey	Bob Mintzer Big Band – Only in New York; Maria Schneider Jazz Orchestra – Evanescence; Toshiko Akiyoshi – Desert Lady / Fantasy; Carla Bley – Big Band Theory	
1996	Tom Scott, GRP All-Star Big Band	All Blues	The Gerald Wilson Orchestra – State Street Sweet; Joe Lovano – Rush Hour; Steve Slagle (Mingus Big Band) – Gunslinging Birds; The Bill Holman Band – A View from the Side	
1997	Grover Mitchell	Live at Manchester Craftsmen's Guild	Marcus Roberts with The Lincoln Center Jazz Orchestra – Portraits in Blue; Mingus Big Band – Live in Time; Rob McConnell and The Boss Brass – Even Canadians Get the Blues; Maria Schneider Orchestra – Coming About	
1998	Joe Henderson	Big Band	J.J. Johnson – The Brass Orchestra; Phil Woods and The Festival Orchestra – Celebration!; The Bill Holman Band – Brilliant Corners; Anthony Wilson – Anthony Wilson	
1999	Grover Mitchell, Count Basie Orchestra	Count Plays Duke	The Gerald Wilson Orchestra – Theme for Monterey; Jon Faddis – Remembrances; The Vanguard Jazz Orchestra – Lickety Split - Music of Jim McNeely; Bill Holman and The Netherlands Metropole Orchestra – Further Adventures	
2000	Bob Florence	Serendipity 18	Anthony Brown's Asian American Orchestra – Far East Suite; Tom Harrell – Time's Mirror; Vince Mendoza – Epiphany; Sam Rivers' Rivbea All-Star Orchestra – Inspiration	
2001	Joe Lovano	52nd Street Themes	Buddy Collette Big Band – The Buddy Collette Big Band In Concert - The Music Of William "Buddy" Collette; The Danish Radio Jazz Orchestra & Jim McNeely – Nice Work; Sam Rivers' Rivbea All-Star Orchestra – Culmination; Maria Schneider Orchestra – Allégresse	
2002	Bob Mintzer Big Band	Homage to Count Basie	Eliane Elias, Bob Brookmeyer and the Danish Radio Jazz Orchestra – Impulsive!; Rob McConnell Tentet – Rob McConnell Tentet; Jim McNeely Tentet – Group Therapy; Nicholas Payton – Dear Louis	
2003	Dave Holland	What Goes Around	Slide Hampton and SWR Big Band – Jazz Matinee; Mingus Big Band – Tonight at Noon... Three or Four Shades of Love; Sammy Nestico – This Is the Moment; Vanguard Jazz Orchestra – Can I Persuade You?	
2004	Michael Brecker	Wide Angles	Wayne Bergeron Big Band – You Call This a Living?; The Carla Bley Big Band – Looking for America; Gordon Goodwin's Big Phat Band – XXL; Gerald Wilson Orchestra – New York, New Sound	
2005	Maria Schneider	Concert in the Garden	Bob Brookmeyer New Art Orchestra – Get Well Soon; John LaBarbera Big Band – On The Wild Side; David Sánchez – Coral; The Vanguard Jazz Orchestra – The Way: Music of Slide Hampton	
2006	Dave Holland	Overtime	John Hollenbeck Large Ensemble – A Blessing; The Bill Holman Band – Bill Holman Band: Live; Mingus Big Band, Orchestra & Dynasty – I Am Three; The Chris Walden Big Band – Home of My Heart	
2007	Randy Brecker with Michael Brecker, Jim Beard, Will Lee, Peter Erskine, Marcio Doctor & Vince Mendoza conducting The WDR Big Band Köln	Some Skunk Funk	Bob Brookmeyer and the New Art Orchestra – Spirit Music; The Joe Lovano Ensemble – Streams of Expression; Mingus Big Band – Live In Tokyo At The Blue Note; The Vanguard Jazz Orchestra – Up From The Skies, Music of Jim McNeely	
2008	Terence Blanchard	A Tale of God's Will (A Requiem for Katrina)	Bob Florence – Eternal Licks & Grooves: Limited Edition; The Bill Holman Band – Hommage; Maria Schneider Orchestra – Sky Blue; Charles Tolliver Big Band – With Love	
2009	Vanguard Jazz Orchestra	Monday Night Live at the Village Vanguard	Vince Mendoza – Blauklang; Joe Lovano with WDR Big Band & Rundfunk Orchestra – Symphonica; Gordon Goodwin's Big Phat Band – Act Your Age; Carla Bley and Her Remarkable Big Band – Appearing Nightly	
2010	New Orleans Jazz Orchestra	Book One	Bob Florence Limited Edition – Legendary; John Hollenbeck Large Ensemble – Eternal Interlude; Sammy Nestico and The SWR Big Band – Fun Time; University of North Texas One O'Clock Lab Band – Lab 2009	
2011	Mingus Big Band	Mingus Big Band Live at Jazz Standard	Darcy James Argue's Secret Society – Infernal Machines; Billy Childs Ensemble featuring the Ying String Quartet – Autumn: In Moving Pictures Jazz – Chamber Music Vol. 2; Dave Holland Octet – Pathways; Metropole Orkest, John Scofield & Vince Mendoza – 54	
2012	Christian McBride Big Band	The Good Feeling	Randy Brecker with DR Big Band – The Jazz Ballad Song Book; Arturo O'Farrill & The Afro Latin Jazz Orchestra – 40 Acres and a Burro; Gerald Wilson Orchestra – Legacy; Miguel Zenón – Alma Adentro: The Puerto Rican Songbook	
2013	Arturo Sandoval	Dear Diz (Every Day I Think of You)	Gil Evans Project – Centennial: Newly Discovered Works of Gil Evans; Bob Mintzer Big Band – For the Moment	
2014	Randy Brecker, Włodek Pawlik Trio, Kalisz Philharmonic	Night in Calisia	Darcy James Argue's Secret Society – Brooklyn Babylon; Brussels Jazz Orchestra Featuring Joe Lovano – Wild Beauty; Alan Ferber – March Sublime; Dave Slonaker Big Band – Intrada	
2015	Gordon Goodwin's Big Phat Band	Life in the Bubble	Clayton-Hamilton Jazz Orchestra – The L. A. Treasures Project; Rufus Reid – Quiet Pride: The Elizabeth Catlett Project; Archie Shepp Attica Blues Orchestra – Live: Hear the Sound; Vanguard Jazz Orchestra – Overtime: Music of Bob Brookmeyer	
2016	Maria Schneider Orchestra	The Thompson Fields	Gil Evans Project – Lines of Color; Marshall Gilkes & WDR Big Band – Köln; Arturo O'Farrill & Afro Latin Jazz Orchestra – Cuba: The Conversation Continues; Patrick Williams – Home Suite Home	
2017	Ted Nash Big Band	Presidential Suite: Eight Variations on Freedom	Darcy James Argue's Secret Society – Real Enemies; John Beasley – Presents Monk'estra, Volume 1; John Daversa – Kaleidoscope Eyes: Music of the Beatles; Bob Mintzer – All L. A. Band	
2018	Christian McBride Big Band	Bringin' It	John Beasley – Monk'estra Vol. 2; Alan Ferber Big Band – Jigsaw; Vince Mendoza & the WDR Big Band Cologne – Homecoming; Chuck Owen & the Jazz Surge – Whispers on the Wind	
2019	John Daversa Big Band featuring DACA Artists	American Dreamers: Voices of Hope, Music of Freedom	Count Basie Orchestra directed by Scotty Barnhart – All About That Basie; Orrin Evans & the Captain Black Big Band – Presence; John Hollenbeck Large Ensemble – All Can Work; Jim McNeely & the Frankfurt Radio Big Band – Barefoot Dances and Other Visions	
2020	Brian Lynch Big Band	The Omni-American Book Club	Anat Cohen Tentet - Triple Helix; Miho Hazama - Dancer In Nowhere; Mike Holober & The Gotham Jazz Orchestra - Hiding Out; Terraza Big Bang - One Day Wonder	
2021	Maria Schneider Orchestra	Data Lords	Gregg August - Dialogues on Race; John Beasley - MONK'estra Plays John Beasley; Orrin Evans & the Captain Black Big Band - The Intangible Between; John Hollenbeck with Theo Bleckmann, Kate McGarry, Gary Versace & the Frankfurt Radio Big Band - Songs You Like A Lot	
2022	Christian McBride Big Band	For Jimmy, Wes and Oliver	The Count Basie Orchestra directed by Scotty Barnhart – Live at Birdland!; Jazzmeia Horn and her Noble Force – Dear Love; Sun Ra Arkestra – Swirling; Yellowjackets + WDR Big Band – Jackets XL	
2023	Steven Feifke, Bijon Watson & the Generation Gap Jazz Orchestra	The Generation Gap Jazz Orchestra	John Beasley, Magnus Lindgren & the SWR Big Band – Bird Lives; Ron Carter & the Jazzaar Festival Big Band directed by Christian Jacob – Remembering Bob Freedman; Steve Gadd, Eddie Gomez, Ronnie Cuber & the WDR Big Band conducted by Michael Abene – Center Stage; Remy Le Boeuf's Assembly of Shadows – Architecture of Storms	
2024	Count Basie Orchestra conducted by Scotty Barnhart	Basie Swings The Blues	ADDA Simfònica, Josep Vincent & Emilio Solla – The Chick Corea Symphony Tribute - Ritmo; Darcy James Argue's Secret Society – Dynamic Maximum Tension; Vince Mendoza & Metropole Orkest – Olympians; Mingus Big Band – The Charles Mingus Centennial Sessions	
2025	Dan Pugach Big Band	Bianca Reimagined: Music For Paws And Persistence	John Beasley & Frankfurt Radio Big Band – Returning To Forever; The Clayton–Hamilton Jazz Orchestra – And So It Goes; Orrin Evans & the Captain Black Big Band – Walk A Mile In My Shoe; Miguel Zenón – Golden City	
2026	Christian McBride Big Band	Without Further Ado, Vol 1	The 8-Bit Big Band - Orchestrator Emulator; Christian McBride Big Band - Without Further Ado, Vol 1; Danilo Pérez & Bohuslän Big Band - Lumen; Deborah Silver & The Count Basie Orchestra - Basie Rocks; Sun Ra Arkestra - Lights on a Satellite; Kenny Wheeler Legacy Featuring The Royal Academy of Music Jazz Orchestra & Frost Jazz Orchestra - Some Days Are Better: The Lost Scores	
2027	Winner TBA on 7 February 2027		Alex Conde - Paco de Lucia: Music for Big Band (Live); Kurt Elling & The WDR Big Band - In the Brass Palace; Frankfurt Radio Big Band & Jim McNeely - Jim McNeely Expeditions; Gordon Goodwin's Big Phat Band - 25 Years of Phatness; Helen Sung Big Band & Helen Sung - Oracles	

== See also ==
- Grammy Award for Best Jazz Instrumental Album
- Grammy Award for Best Improvised Jazz Solo
- Grammy Award for Best Jazz Vocal Album

== Sources ==
- Grammy Awards – Past Winners Search As noted in this article: search years are offset by one year.
