= Guitar Slinger (The Brian Setzer Orchestra album) =

Studio album by The Brian Setzer Orchestra
- Released: 23 April 1996 (International) & 19 July 1995 (Japan)
- Genre: Swing; jump blues
- Length: 43:32
- Label: Interscope
- Producer: Phil Ramone

The Brian Setzer Orchestra chronology
The Brian Setzer Orchestra (1994)	Guitar Slinger (1996)	The Dirty Boogie (1998)

Alternative cover
- Japanese Cover

Professional ratings
Review scores
Source	Rating
Allmusic	(3/5)

Guitar Slinger is the second studio album by the American swing revival band The Brian Setzer Orchestra. It was originally released in Japan in 1995, with a resequenced version released internationally in 1996. The album continues the band's fusion of big band swing and rockabilly, featuring a mix of original compositions and cover songs. Notable tracks include "Hoodoo Voodoo Doll" and a rendition of Gene Pitney's "Town Without Pity." Guitar Slinger further established the Brian Setzer Orchestra’s role in the 1990s swing revival movement.

== Critical reception ==
Guitar Slinger received generally positive reviews from music critics. Reviewers praised the album's energy, musicianship, and creative arrangements. Brian Setzer’s guitar performance was frequently highlighted, as was the band’s tight brass and rhythm sections. Some critics noted the album’s improved cohesion and production compared to their debut.

AllMusic awarded the album 4 out of 5 stars, describing it as “a bold and brassy leap forward” and “a spirited showcase for Setzer’s dual love of vintage rock and swing.” Entertainment Weekly praised the album’s “timeless party vibe” and “expert musicianship,” though some reviews suggested the novelty of the swing revival genre might limit broader appeal.

Despite modest commercial performance in the U.S. at the time of release, Guitar Slinger contributed to the foundation that would lead to the Brian Setzer Orchestra’s mainstream breakthrough with The Dirty Boogie in 1998.

== Track listing ==
=== International version ===
No.	Title	Writer(s)	Length
1.	"The House Is Rockin'"	Doyle Bramhall / Stevie Ray Vaughan	3:02
2.	"Hoodoo Voodoo Doll"	Brian Setzer	3:39
3.	"Town Without Pity"	Dimitri Tiomkin / Ned Washington	4:04
4.	"Rumble In Brighton"	Slim Jim Phantom / Brian Setzer	3:35
5.	"The Man With The Magic Touch"	Brian Setzer	3:24
6.	"(The Legend Of) Johnny Kool"	Brian Setzer	4:07
7.	"Ghost Radio"	Brian Setzer / Joe Strummer	3:41
8.	"(Everytime I Hear) That Mellow Saxophone"	Bumps Blackwell / John Marascalco / Roy Montrell	3:30
9.	"Buzz Buzz"	Brian Setzer	3:30
10.	"My Baby Only Cares For Me"	Brian Setzer	4:09
11.	"Hey Louis Prima"	Brian Setzer	2:56
12.	"Sammy Davis City"	Brian Setzer / Joe Strummer	3:57

=== Japanese version ===
No.	Title	Length
1.	"Ghost Radio"	3:42
2.	"That Mellow Saxophone"	3:31
3.	"Buzz Buzz"	3:31
4.	"Man With The Magic Touch"	3:25
5.	"Hoodoo Voodoo Doll"	3:39
6.	"My Baby Only Cares For Me"	4:10
7.	"Guitar Slinger"	6:45
8.	"Rocky Mountain Shakedown"	4:43
9.	"Hey, Louis Prima"	2:58
10.	"Sammy Davis City"	3:59
11.	"Honky Tonk"	4:31

== Personnel ==
- Brian Setzer - guitar, vocals
- Steve Fowler - 2nd alto saxophone
- Patrick Williams - arranger, orchestration
- Michael Acosta - tenor saxophone
- Tom Bahler - backing vocals
- Alexandra Brown - backing vocals
- Sal Cracchiolo - trumpet
- Bernie Dresel - drums
- Dan Fornero - trumpet
- Ray Hermann - multi-instruments
- Dan Higgins - multi-instruments
- Mark Jones - trombone, orchestration
- Andy Martin - multi-instruments
- George McMullen - trombone
- Bob Parr - bass
- Don Roberts - baritone saxophone
- Bennett Salvay - arranger, orchestration
- Bob Sandman - tenor saxophone
- Carmen Twillie - backing vocals
- Michael Vlatkovitch - trombone
- Stan Watkins - trumpet
- Wayne Bergeron - multi-instruments
- Roger Burn - piano, vibraphone
- Robbie Hioki - tuba, bass trombone
- George Shelby - clarinet, 1st alto saxophone
- Charlie Biggs - trumpet

Technical

- Allen Sides - recording, mixing
- Nick Egan - art direction
- Michele Laurita - cover photography
