= Gordon Goodwin =

American musician, composer and conductor (1954–2025)

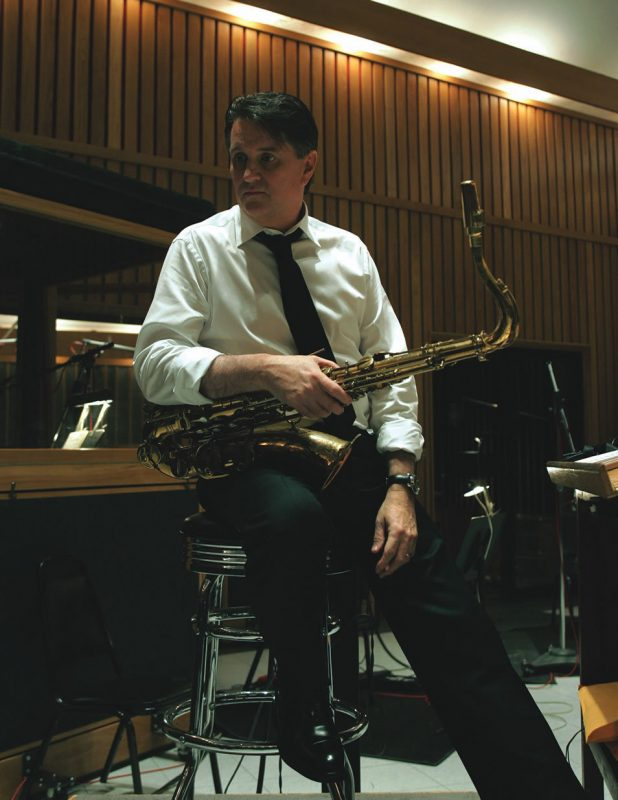
- Goodwin in 2006

Background information
- Born: Gordon Louis Goodwin; December 30, 1954; Wichita, Kansas, U.S.
- Died: December 8, 2025 (aged 70) Los Angeles, California, U.S.
- Genres: Jazz; big band
- Occupation: Composer; arranger; conductor
- Instruments: Piano; saxophone
- Labels: Immergent; Telarc
- Website: www.bigphatband.com

Gordon Louis Goodwin (December 30, 1954 – December 8, 2025) was an American pianist, saxophonist, composer, arranger and conductor. He was the leader of Gordon Goodwin's Big Phat Band. He won three Daytime Emmy Awards, four Grammy Awards, and 25 Grammy nominations for his compositions and arrangements.

== Early life and education ==
Gordon Goodwin was born in Wichita, Kansas, on December 30, 1954, the son of Gordon E. Goodwin and Alice Ann Bock. He wrote his first big band chart, called "Hang Loose", when he was in the seventh grade. He attended Bonita High School in La Verne, California. He continued his musical education at California State University, Northridge, with Joel Leach and Bill Calkins.

== Career ==
Following graduation from college, Goodwin was employed as a musician at the Disneyland theme park in Anaheim, California. Subsequently, Disney approached him to write a musical show featuring past and present Mouseketeers, including Britney Spears and Christina Aguilera. Since then, Goodwin rose to prominence in the American studio music scene with his big band, The Big Phat Band. He wrote and worked with artists including Ray Charles, Christina Aguilera, Johnny Mathis, John Williams, Natalie Cole, David Foster; Sarah Vaughan, Mel Tormé, Leslie Odom, Jr., Idina Menzel, Lang Lang, and Quincy Jones. Goodwin was the host of a nationally syndicated jazz radio program called Phat Tracks with Gordon Goodwin, that aired on weekends on KSDS, San Diego's 88.3 FM.

== Death ==
Goodwin suffered a stroke from which he did not regain consciousness and died in Los Angeles on December 8, 2025, at the age of 70, due to complications of pancreatic cancer.

== Discography ==
- "Festival of the Lion King" (Buena Vista, 2001)
- Swingin' for the Fences (Immergent, 2001)
- XXL (Silverline, 2003)
- The Phat Pack (Silverline, 2006)
- Bah, Humduck! A Looney Tunes Christmas (Immergent, 2006)
- Act Your Age (Immergent, 2008)
- Dave Siebels With: Gordon Goodwin's Big Phat Band (PBGL, 2009)
- That's How We Roll (Telarc, 2011)
- Life in the Bubble (Telarc, 2014)
- Wrap This! A Big Phat Christmas (Music of Content, 2015)
- The Gordian Knot (Music of Content, 2019)
- The Gordian Knot (Dolby Atmos Release) (Music of Content, 2020)
- The Reset (Music of Content, 2021)

== Awards and honors ==
Goodwin received many individual awards, including a Grammy Award for Best Instrumental Arrangement for his work on the feature film The Incredibles.

=== Grammy Awards ===
- Best Instrumental Arrangement: "The Incredits" (2005), "Rhapsody in Blue" (2011), "On Green Dolphin Street" (2013)
- Best Large Jazz Ensemble Album: Life in the Bubble (2014)

=== Grammy Award nominations ===
- Best Large Jazz Ensemble Album: XXL (2003), Act Your Age (2008)
- Best Instrumental Composition: "Sing, Sang, Sung" (2000), "Hunting Wabbits" (2003), "Hit the Ground Running" (2008), "Hunting Wabbits 3 (Get Off My Lawn)" (2011), "California Pictures for String Quartet" (2013), "Life in the Bubble" (2014)
- Best Instrumental Arrangement: "Bach 2 Part Invention in D Minor" (2000), "Attack of the Killer Tomatoes" (2006), "Yo Tannenbaum" (2007), "Yesterdays" (2008), "Salt Peanuts! (Mani Salado)" (2012)
- Best Instrumental Arrangement Accompanying Vocalist(s): "Comes Love" (2003)
- Best Arrangement, Instrumental or A Cappella: "Get Smart" (2014)
- Best Arrangement, Instruments and Vocals: "Party Rockers" (2014), "Do You Hear What I Hear?" (2016)
- Best Arrangement, Instruments and Vocals: "I Loves You Porgy" / "There's A Boat That's Leavin' Soon For New York" (2017)

=== Daytime Emmy Awards ===
- Outstanding Music Direction and Composition, Animaniacs (1998, 1999)
- Outstanding Music Direction and Composition, Histeria! (2000)

=== Memberships ===
- Goodwin was initiated into the men's music fraternity, Phi Mu Alpha Sinfonia, as a National Honorary member and was made a Signature Sinfonian at the 55th National Convention in New Orleans, Louisiana, 2015.

== See also ==
- List of jazz arrangers
