= Wolfgang's Big Night Out =

Studio album by The Brian Setzer Orchestra
- Released: September 25, 2007
- Recorded: 2007
- Studio: Flowers Studio, Minneapolis, Minnesota
- Genre: Swing
- Label: Surfdog Records
- Producer: Brian Setzer

The Brian Setzer Orchestra chronology
| Dig That Crazy Christmas (2005) | Wolfgang's Big Night Out (2007) | Christmas Rocks! (2008) |

Professional ratings
Review scores
| Source | Rating |
|---|---|
| Allmusic | 3.5/5 stars |

Wolfgang's Big Night Out is the seventh studio album from the American swing revival band The Brian Setzer Orchestra, released on September 25, 2007, on Surfdog Records. It is a collection of swing versions of classical compositions. The album is 'largely instrumental', with only two songs ("One More Night With You" and "Honey Man") containing lyrics.

The album was nominated for a Grammy Award in the Best Classical Crossover Album category.

== Track listing ==
On July 18, 2007, the track listing was released on Brian Setzer's official website.

1. "Take The 5th" (based on Beethoven's 5th symphony)
2. "One More Night With You" (based on Grieg's "In the Hall of the Mountain King")
3. "Wolfgang's Big Night Out" (based on Mozart's "Eine kleine Nachtmusik")
4. "Honey Man" (based on Rimsky-Korsakov’s "Flight of the Bumblebee")
5. "Yes We Can Can" (based on the "can-can" (Infernal Galop) from Offenbach's "Orpheus in the Underworld")
6. "Swingin' Willie" (based on Rossini's "William Tell Overture")
7. "Sabre Dance" (based on Khachaturian's "Sabre Dance")
8. "For Lisa" (based on Beethoven's "Für Elise")
9. "Here Comes The Broad" (based on Wagner's "Lohengrin" and Mendelssohn's "A Midsummer Night's Dream")
10. "1812 Overdrive" (based on Tchaikovsky's "1812 Overture")
11. "Some River In Europe" (based on Strauss's "The Blue Danube")
12. "Take A Break Guys" (based on "God Rest Ye Merry, Gentlemen")
13. "Nutcracker Suite" a bonus track based on the score of The Nutcracker

== Charts ==
| Chart (2007) | Peak position |
|---|---|
| US Billboard 200 | 141 |
