= That's How We Roll =

Studio album by Gordon Goodwin's Big Phat Band
- Released: April 12, 2011
- Genre: Jazz, big band
- Length: 67:27
- Label: Telarc
- Producer: Gregg Field

Gordon Goodwin's Big Phat Band chronology
Act Your Age (2008)	That's How We Roll (2011)	Life in the Bubble (2014)

Professional ratings
Review scores
Source	Rating
AllMusic	3.5/5 stars

That's How We Roll is the fifth studio album by Gordon Goodwin's Big Phat Band, released on April 12, 2011. It features the title track, "That's How We Roll", the Grammy-nominated "Hunting Wabbits 3 (Get Off My Lawn)", and the Grammy-winning "Rhapsody in Blue".

== Track listing ==
All tracks are written by Gordon Goodwin except where noted.

No.	Title	Writer(s)	Length
1.	"That's How We Roll"		7:07
2.	"Howdiz Songo?"		7:09
3.	"Rippin' 'n' Runnin'"		6:58
4.	"Hunting Wabbits 3 (Get Off My Lawn)"		7:56
5.	"Everlasting"		5:40
6.	"Gaining on You"		5:33
7.	"Never Enough"	Gordon Goodwin, Lisa Goodwin	5:45
8.	"It's Not Polite to Point"		7:53
9.	"Race to the Bridge"		6:11
10.	"Rhapsody in Blue"	George Gershwin	6:59
