= Swingin' for the Fences =

Studio album by Gordon Goodwin's Big Phat Band
- Released: January 23, 2001
- Recorded: 1999
- Genre: Jazz, big band, funk
- Length: 60:09
- Label: Silverline
- Producer: Ken Caillat, Leo Rossi, John Trickett, Jon Baker, Gordon Goodwin, Dan Savant

Gordon Goodwin's Big Phat Band chronology
Swingin' for the Fences (2001)	XXL (2003)

Swingin' for the Fences is the debut album by Gordon Goodwin's Big Phat Band, an 18-piece big band led by Gordon Goodwin.

Goodwin composed the music except for "Two-Part Invention in D Minor", a jazz update of J. S. Bach. He wrote the arrangements and played alto and soprano saxophone. "Sing Sang Sung" is based on "Sing, Sing, Sing", which was written by Louis Prima and made famous by Benny Goodman's big band.

There are solos by the Big Phat Band's Dan Higgins on saxophone, Andy Martin on trombone, Tom Ranier on piano, and Goodwin on saxophone. Guests include Arturo Sandoval, Eric Marienthal, Eddie Daniels, and Brandon Fields.

Swingin' for the Fences received two Grammy Award nominations. It was the first album released on DVD-Audio and the first DVD-Audio to be nominated for two Grammy Awards.

== Track listing ==
All compositions are by Gordon Goodwin except "Bach Two-Part Invention in D Minor" by Johann Sebastian Bach and Gordon Goodwin.

No.	Title	Length
1.	"Sing, Sang, Sung"	5:35
2.	"Count Bubba"	7:33
3.	"Samba Del Gringo"	6:59
4.	"Bach Two-Part Invention in D minor"	7:50
5.	"I Remember"	5:49
6.	"Swingin' for the Fences"	5:08
7.	"Mueva Los Huesos"	4:52
8.	"Second Chances"	5:04
9.	"There's the Rub"	5:46
10.	"A Few Good Men"	5:33
