= Boogie Woogie Christmas =

Studio album by The Brian Setzer Orchestra
- Released: October 22, 2002
- Length: 41:38
- Label: Surfdog
- Producer: Peter Collins

The Brian Setzer Orchestra chronology
Best of The Big Band (2002)	Boogie Woogie Christmas (2002)	The Ultimate Collection (2004)

Boogie Woogie Christmas is a 2002 Christmas album recorded by the Brian Setzer Orchestra.

== Track listing ==
=== Original ===
1. "Jingle Bells" - 2:22
2. "Boogie Woogie Santa Claus" - 3:02
3. "Winter Wonderland" - 2:40
4. "Blue Christmas" - 2:48
5. "Santa Claus Is Back in Town" - 3:48
6. "Baby, It's Cold Outside" (duet with Ann-Margret) - 3:43
7. "The Nutcracker Suite" - 7:13
8. "(Everybody's Waitin' for) The Man with the Bag" - 2:48
9. "Sleigh Ride" - 2:40
10. "So They Say It's Christmas" - 4:46
11. "O Holy Night" - 4:49
12. "The Amens" - 0:59

=== Bonus Tracks ===
==== 2003 Re-Release ====
- "Let It Snow, Let It Snow, Let It Snow" (Target Exclusive) - 2:09
- "Run Rudolph Run" (K-Mart Exclusive) - 3:31
- "What Are You Doin' New Year's Eve" (Wal-Mart Exclusive) - 3:34
- "Cactus Christmas" (Best Buy Exclusive) - 2:46

==== 2004 Re-Release ====
- "Run Rudolph Run" - 3:31
- "Cactus Christmas" - 2:46
- "Santa Drives a Hot Rod" (Target Exclusive) - 4:05
- "Christmas Island" (Target Exclusive) - 2:23

== Charts ==
Chart (2002)	Peak position
US Top Holiday Albums (Billboard)	11
