= Andy Martin (American musician) =

American jazz musician

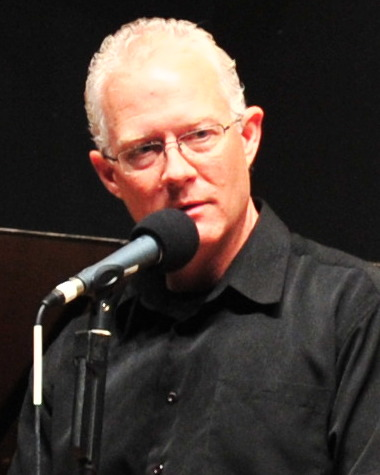
- Martin in 2012

Background information
- Born: Andrew Morgan Martin; August 10, 1960 (age 65); Provo, Utah, U.S.
- Genres: Jazz
- Occupation: Musician
- Instruments: Trombone, bass trombone, euphonium
- Spouse: Angela Thielen (div. 2008) Maria Vilchis (m. 2019)

Andrew Morgan Martin (born August 10, 1960) is an American jazz trombonist and Los Angeles studio player. He has recorded 12 albums as a leader or co-leader, highlighted by a widely acclaimed record with the Metropole Orchestra. He is a member of Gordon Goodwin's Big Phat Band and was the featured soloist with the Bill Holman big band for 15 years. Martin is also a member of the Pacific Jazz Orchestra led by Chris Walden, and has been in Tom Kubis' big band since its inception. He has recorded and toured with numerous renowned artists, including Poncho Sanchez, Arturo Sandoval, Quincy Jones, Michael Bublé, John Legend, David Foster, Earth, Wind & Fire, Lady Gaga, Lizzo, Coldplay, Metallica, Black Eyed Peas, Jennifer Hudson, Josh Groban, and The Who.

== Early life ==
Martin was born in Provo, Utah to Lani (née Morgan) and David Martin (1935–2024). He lived in Castro Valley, California with his two brothers, Scott and Stan, until he was nine years old, when his family relocated to Long Beach, California.

== Career ==
In addition to his jazz solo work, Martin has played on over 350 major motion picture soundtracks. He performed the trombone solo in the opening credits of Monsters, Inc. and featured as a soloist in La La Land and The Secret Life of Pets. He also served as the trombone soloist for the character Connie in the Pixar animated film Soul.

His television credits include playing for Family Guy, King of the Hill, Dancing with the Stars, and American Dad!. He was the lead trombonist on American Idol during its first three seasons. He was initiated as an honorary member of Phi Mu Alpha Sinfonia in 2018. More recently, he contributed to the soundtracks of the 2024 films Despicable Me 4 and IF.

== Personal life ==
Martin has five children: three from an early relationship and two from his marriage to Angela Thielen, which ended in divorce in 2008. On November 8, 2019, he married Maria Vilchis, with whom he has a step-daughter.

=== Relationship with the McCurdy family ===
Following the 2013 death of her mother, author and former child actress Jennette McCurdy learned that the man who raised her was not her biological father. In her 2022 memoir I'm Glad My Mom Died, McCurdy noted that her biological father was an unnamed Los Angeles-based jazz musician named Andrew, who was subsequently identified by media sources as Martin. The two have met in person since the discovery.

== Discography ==
- Leading Off (Resurgent, 1995)
- Andy Martin & Metropole Orchestra (Mons, 1997)
- The Project with Vic Lewis (Drewbone, 2004)
- Trombone Titans with Carl Fontana (Drewbone, 2013)
