= Stray Cats discography =

- Studio albums: 9
- Live albums: 26
- Compilation albums: 10
- Singles: 27
- Video albums: 10

This is the discography of American rockabilly band Stray Cats.

== Albums ==
=== Studio albums ===
Title	Album details	Peak chart positions										Certifications
Title	Album details	US	AUS	CAN	FIN	GER	NL	NZ	SWE	SWI	UK	Certifications
Stray Cats	Released: February 1981; Label: Arista; Format: LP, MC	—	41 (Note: The Stray Cats album was titled Runaway Boys in Australia.)	—	1	—	4	2	3	—	6	BPI: Gold; RMNZ: Platinum
Gonna Ball	Released: November 1981; Label: Arista; Format: LP, MC	—	61	—	6	—	—	24	40	—	48	BPI: Silver
Rant n' Rave with the Stray Cats	Released: August 15, 1983; Label: EMI America; Format: LP, MC, 8-track	14	28	15	16	25	44	—	43	27	51	RIAA: Gold; MC: Platinum
Rock Therapy	Released: August 22, 1986; Label: EMI; Format: CD, LP, MC	122	—	86	—	—	—	—	—	—	—	
Blast Off!	Released: March 1989; Label: EMI; Format: CD, LP, MC	111	90	80	7	—	—	—	—	—	58	
Let's Go Faster!	Released: 19 December 1990; Label: InsideOut; Format: CD, LP	—	57	—	—	—	—	—	—	—	—	
Choo Choo Hot Fish	Released: May 22, 1992; Label: JRS; Format: CD, MC	—	—	—	19	—	—	—	—	—	—	
Original Cool	Released: 26 May 1993; Label: Essential; Format: CD	—	—	—	18	—	—	—	—	—	—	
40	Released: May 24, 2019; Label: Surfdog; Format: CD, LP, digital download	93	—	—	7	6	26	—	—	7	53	
"—" denotes a recording that did not chart or was not released in that territory.

=== Live albums ===
Title	Album details	Peak chart positions			
Title	Album details	GER	NL	FIN	SWI
Live – Tear It Up	Released: February 1994; Label: Receiver; Format: CD	—	—	—	—
Something Else – Live	Released: 21 September 1994; Label: Receiver; Format: CD	—	—	—	—
Struttin' – Live	Released: February 2, 1999; Label: Big Ear Music; Format: CD	—	—	—	—
Live	Released: March 9, 1999; Label: Cleopatra; Format: CD	—	—	—	—
Rockabilly Rules – At Their Best... Live	Released: 1999; Label: Castle Music; Format: CD	—	—	—	—
Feline Frisky	Released: May 21, 2001; Label: Snapper Music; Format: 2xCD	—	—	—	—
Runaway Boys Live!	Released: May 27, 2002; Label: Castle Select; Format: CD	—	—	—	—
Rumble in Brixton	Released: November 9, 2004; Label: Surfdog; Format: 2xCD	—	—	—	—
Live from Europe – Paris, 5th July, 2004	Released: February 2005; Label: Surfdog; Format: CD	—	—	—	—
Live from Europe – Brussels, 6th July, 2004	Released: February 2005; Label: Surfdog; Format: CD	—	—	—	—
Live from Europe – Helsinki, 9 July, 2004	Released: February 2005; Label: Surfdog; Format: CD	—	—	34	—
Live from Europe – Turku, 10 July, 2004	Released: February 2005; Label: Surfdog; Format: CD	—	—	—	—
Live from Europe – Berlin, 12 July, 2004	Released: February 2005; Label: Surfdog; Format: CD	—	—	—	—
Live from Europe – Hamburg, 13 July, 2004	Released: February 2005; Label: Surfdog; Format: CD	—	—	—	—
Live from Europe – Amsterdam, 14 July, 2004	Released: February 2005; Label: Surfdog; Format: CD	—	—	—	—
Live from Europe – Manchester, 16 July, 2004	Released: February 2005; Label: Surfdog; Format: CD	—	—	—	—
Live from Europe – London, 18 July, 2004	Released: February 2005; Label: Surfdog; Format: CD	—	—	—	—
Live from Europe – Munich, 20 July, 2004	Released: February 2005; Label: Surfdog; Format: CD	—	—	—	—
Live from Europe – Barcelona, 22 July, 2004	Released: February 2005; Label: Surfdog; Format: CD	—	—	—	—
Live from Europe – Gijon, 24 July, 2004	Released: February 2005; Label: Surfdog; Format: CD	—	—	—	—
Live from Europe – Lyon, 26 July, 2004	Released: February 2005; Label: Surfdog; Format: CD	—	—	—	—
Live from Europe – Luzern, 27 July, 2004	Released: February 2005; Label: Surfdog; Format: CD	—	—	—	—
Live from Europe – Bonn, 29 July, 2004	Released: February 2005; Label: Surfdog; Format: CD	—	—	—	—
Live from Europe – Holland, 30 July, 2004	Released: February 2005; Label: Surfdog; Format: CD	—	—	—	—
Live at Rockpalast – 1983 Loreley Open Air + 1981 Cologne	Released: June 17, 2015; Label: MIG; Format: 2xCD+DVD	—	—	—	—
Rock This Town – From LA to London	Released: September 9, 2020; Label: Surfdog; Format: CD, 2xLP, digital download	20	3	35	98
"—" denotes a recording that did not chart or was not released in that territory.

=== Compilation albums ===
Title	Album details	Peak chart positions				Certifications
Title	Album details	US	CAN	FIN	GER	Certifications
Built for Speed (Note: While Built for Speed was the first Stray Cats album released in North America, classing it as a studio album, it is technically a compilation album as it consists of songs taken from the band's first two albums.)	Released: June 7, 1982; Label: EMI; Format: LP, MC, 8-track	2	1	—	—	RIAA: Platinum; MC: 2× Platinum
Back to the Alley: The Best of the Stray Cats	Released: February 1990; Label: Arista; Format: CD, LP, MC	—	—	—	—	
The Best of the Stray Cats – Rock This Town	Released: October 15, 1990; Label: EMI; Format: CD, MC	—	—	—	—	
Greatest Hits	Released: November 3, 1992; Label: Curb; Format: CD, LP, MC	—	—	—	—	
Runaway Boys: A Retrospective '81 to '92	Released: January 14, 1997; Label: EMI; Format: CD, MC	—	—	—	—	
The Best of Stray Cats	Released: 1996; Label: BMG/Camden; Format: CD	—	—	—	—	
Greatest Hits	Released: January 25, 2000; Label: EMI/Capitol; Format: CD	—	—	—	—	
Hollywood Strut – Unreleased Cuts	Released: October 3, 2000; Label: Cleopatra; Format: CD	—	—	—	—	
The Very Best Of	Released: 20 June 2003; Label: BMG; Format: CD	—	—	39	—	
Rock This Town – The Collection	Released: 26 July 2013; Label: Camden; Format: CD, digital download	—	—	—	—	
Runaway Boys! The Anthology	Released: September 27, 2019; Label: BMG; Format: 2xCD, 2xLP, digital download	—	—	—	45	
"—" denotes a recording that did not chart or was not released in that territory.

=== Video albums ===
Title	Album details
Stray Cats	Released: 1984; Label: Sony/Picture Music; Format: VHS, Betamax, LaserDisc
Stray Tracks	Released: March 1985; Label: Arista Video/Virgin; Format: VHS
Bring It Back Again	Released: September 26, 1989; Label: EMI; Format: VHS
Rock Tokyo	Released: November 7, 1990; Label: BMG Video; Format: VHS, LaserDisc
Rock Paris	Released: November 6, 1991; Label: BMG Video; Format: VHS, LaserDisc
Rock Detroit	Released: October 21, 1992; Label: BMG Video; Format: VHS, LaserDisc
Greatest Hits	Released: January 8, 1993; Label: BMG Video; Format: VHS, LaserDisc
Best Of	Released: April 1, 1993; Label: BMG Video; Format: VHS, LaserDisc
Rumble in Brixton	Released: November 9, 2004; Label: Surfdog; Format: DVD
Live at Montreux 1981	Released: November 6, 2012; Label: Eagle Vision; Format: DVD

== Singles ==
Title	Year	Peak chart positions										Certifications	Album
Title	Year	US	US Rock	AUS	BEL (FL)	CAN	FIN	IRE	NL	NZ	UK	Certifications	Album
"Runaway Boys"	1980	—	—	15	3	—	1	20	4	—	9	BPI: Silver	Stray Cats
"Rock This Town" (Note: "Rock This Town" and "Stray Cat Strut" were not released in the US and Canada until 1982 when Built for Speed was released.)	1981	9	4	38	3	6	8	6	3	18	9	MC: Gold	Stray Cats
"Stray Cat Strut"	1981	3	41	57	24	3	20	8	7	9	11		Stray Cats
"The Race Is On" (with Dave Edmunds)	1981	—	—	—	—	—	—	17	—	—	34		Twangin...
"Down Town (Cross That Bridge)" (Japan-only release)	1981	—	—	—	—	—	—	—	—	—	—		Gonna Ball (Japanese edition)
"You Don't Believe Me"	1981	—	—	—	—	—	—	—	—	—	57		Gonna Ball
"Lonely Summer Nights" (Japan-only release)	1981	—	—	—	—	—	—	—	—	—	—		Gonna Ball
"Little Miss Prissy"	1981	—	—	—	29	—	—	—	—	—	—		Gonna Ball
"Gonna Ball" (Netherlands-only release)	1982	—	—	—	—	—	—	—	—	—	—		Gonna Ball
"Baby Blue Eyes" (France-only release)	1982	—	—	—	—	—	—	—	—	—	—		Gonna Ball
"(She's) Sexy + 17"	1983	5	2	21	10	4	17	29	22	41	29	MC: Gold	Rant n' Rave with the Stray Cats
"Rebels Rule"	1983	—	—	—	—	—	—	—	—	—	90		Rant n' Rave with the Stray Cats
"I Won't Stand in Your Way"	1983	35	—	—	—	26	—	—	—	—	—		Rant n' Rave with the Stray Cats
"Look At That Cadillac"	1984	68	—	—	—	—	—	—	—	—	—		Rant n' Rave with the Stray Cats
"I'm a Rocker" (promo-only release)	1986	—	—	—	—	—	—	—	—	—	—		Rock Therapy
"Reckless" (promo-only release)	1986	—	—	—	—	—	—	—	—	—	—		Rock Therapy
"Bring It Back Again"	1989	—	35	109	—	—	13	—	—	24	64		Blast Off!
"Gina"	1989	—	—	—	—	—	14	—	—	—	88		Blast Off!
"Gene & Eddie"	1989	—	—	—	—	—	—	—	—	—	—		Blast Off!
"Cross of Love" (Australia-only release)	1990	—	—	94	—	—	—	—	—	—	—		Let's Go Faster
"Struck by Lightning" (Australia-only release)	1991	—	—	143	—	—	—	—	—	—	—		Let's Go Faster
"Town Without Pity" (Australia-only release)	1991	—	—	170	—	—	—	—	—	—	—		Let's Go Faster
"Elvis on Velvet"	1992	—	—	197	—	—	—	—	66	—	—		Choo Choo Hot Fish
"Cry Baby"	1992	—	—	—	—	—	—	—	—	—	—		Choo Choo Hot Fish
"Can't Help Falling in Love" (Japan-only release)	1993	—	—	—	—	—	—	—	—	—	—		Original Cool
"Mystery Train Kept a Rollin'" (promo-only release)	2004	—	—	—	—	—	—	—	—	—	—		Rumble in Brixton
"Cat Fight (Over a Dog Like Me)"	2019	—	—	—	—	—	—	—	—	—	—		40
"—" denotes releases that did not chart or were not released in that territory.
