= Rock Therapy (Stray Cats album) =

Studio album by Stray Cats
- Released: August 1986
- Studio: Capitol Studios
- Genre: Rockabilly
- Length: 31:25
- Label: EMI America
- Producer: Stray Cats

Stray Cats chronology
Rant N' Rave With The Stray Cats (1983)	Rock Therapy (1986)	Blast Off! (1989)

Rock Therapy is the fourth studio album by American rockabilly band Stray Cats, released in August 1986 by EMI America. It was produced by Stray Cats. The album reached the No. 122 position on the Billboard 200 chart but failed to chart outside the U.S. Singles released from the album include "I'm a Rocker" and "Reckless". Rock Therapy was released as a reunion album after Setzer's solo effort, The Knife Feels Like Justice, and the trio of Phantom, Rocker and Slick self-titled LP.

== Critical reception ==
Writing for People Weekly, critic Mary Shaughnessy contrasted Rock Therapy with the band members' solo albums predating it. Shaughnessy praised the album for bringing "renewed" vigor and exceeding the trio's separate efforts and specifically highlighted Setzer's guitar work as being more inspired than his own solo album. She praised the production (a group effort) of this album over the previous Stray Cats albums and even against the then-current trend of "high-tech mush" in pop music. The Sun-Sentinel's Kevin Davis wrote in his review that Rock Therapy is a "fun" album filled with "upbeat" songs. On the other hand, the Ottawa Citizen's Evelyn Erskine found that compared to the band's previous work, the album "takes a more serious approach than usual to rockabilly." Greg Quill of the Toronto Star thought it was "probably the best Stray Cats album to date," despite being "recorded spontaneously and almost on a whim." In his review of the 2008 reissue of the album, The News-Press's Mark Marymont thought it was "all great fun and almost the equal of [the band's] first two best-sellers."

== Track listing ==
1. "Rock Therapy" (Alice Bayer, Glen Moore, Milton Subotsky)
2. "Reckless" (Brian Setzer)
3. "Race with the Devil" (Gene Vincent, Sheriff Tex Davis)
4. "Looking for Someone To Love" (Buddy Holly, Norman Petty)
5. "I Wanna Cry" (Slim Jim Phantom, Lee Rocker)
6. "I'm a Rocker" (Setzer, Slim Jim Phantom, Lee Rocker)
7. "Beautiful Delilah" (Chuck Berry)
8. "One Hand Loose" (Charlie Feathers, Jerry Huffman, Joe Chastain)
9. "Broken Man" (Setzer, Slim Jim Phantom, Lee Rocker)
10. "Change of Heart" (Setzer, Slim Jim Phantom, Lee Rocker)

== Personnel ==
- Brian Setzer – guitar, vocals
- Lee Rocker – bass, vocals
- Slim Jim Phantom – drums
- Earl Slick – guitar on "I Wanna Cry"
- Tommy Byrnes – guitar

== Charts ==
Chart (1986)	Peak position
Canada Top Albums/CDs (RPM)	86
US Billboard 200	122
