= Runaway Boys =

Single by Stray Cats

from the album Stray Cats/Built for Speed
- B-side: "My One Desire"
- Released: November 21, 1980
- Genre: Rockabilly; rock and roll
- Length: 2:57
- Label: Arista
- Songwriters: Brian Setzer, Slim Jim Phantom
- Producer: Dave Edmunds

Stray Cats singles chronology
"Runaway Boys" (1980)	"Rock This Town" (1981)

"Runaway Boys" is the debut single by American rockabilly band Stray Cats, released November 21, 1980, by Arista Records in the UK, where it peaked at No. 9 on the Singles Chart. Its biggest success was in Finland, where it reached number one. The song was later included on the band's 1981 self-titled debut album.

Its first US release, by EMI America, was on the June 1982 album Built for Speed.

== Cover versions ==
"Runaway Boys" was later covered by Drake Bell on his 2014 album Ready, Steady, Go!, which was produced by Brian Setzer.

== Charts ==
=== Weekly charts ===
Chart (1980–81)	Peak position
Australia (Kent Music Report)	15
Belgium (Ultratop 50 Flanders)	3
Finland (Suomen virallinen lista)	1
Ireland (IRMA)	20
Netherlands (Dutch Top 40)	3
Netherlands (Single Top 100)	4
UK Singles (Official Charts)	9

=== Year-end charts ===
Year-end chart performance for "Runaway Boys"
Chart (1981)	Position
Australia (Kent Music Report)	91
Netherlands (Dutch Top 40)	46
Netherlands (Single Top 100)	86
