= 13 (Brian Setzer album) =

Studio album by Brian Setzer
- Released: October 24, 2006
- Recorded: 2006, Pachyderm Studio – Minneapolis
- Label: Surfdog Records
- Producers: Brian Setzer, Dave Darling

Brian Setzer chronology
Dig That Crazy Christmas (2005)	13 (2006)	Red Hot & Live (2007)

Professional ratings
Review scores
Source	Rating
Allmusic	3.5/5 stars

13 is the thirteenth solo album from American musician Brian Setzer. It was released in 2006 on Surfdog Records, and contained the Japanese hit single "Back Streets Of Tokyo". Setzer had originally intended for the album to have one direction, or sound, but after thinking about how The Beatles' albums were so diverse, he decided to include many different styles on the album.

Brian Setzer and Slim Jim Phantom, who appears on "Really Rockabilly", were both in the Stray Cats. "We Are The Marauders" was written by Brian Setzer for the rockabilly band The Marauders, who opened for the Brian Setzer Orchestra in 2006. The song appears on their self-titled album.

== Track listing ==
All tracks are written by Brian Setzer, except where noted.

No.	Title	Length
1.	"Drugs & Alcohol (Bullet Holes)"	4:57
2.	"Take A Chance On Love"	4:01
3.	"Broken Down Piece Of Junk"	2:43
4.	"We Are The Marauders"	2:28
5.	"Don't Say You Love Me" (Matt Rocker)	3:19
6.	"Really Rockabilly"	3:09
7.	"Rocket Cathedrals" (Robert Bryan)	2:51
8.	"Mini Bar Blues"	2:03
9.	"Bad Bad Girl (In A Bad Bad World)"	4:29
10.	"When Hepcat Gets The Blues"	2:49
11.	"Back Streets Of Tokyo"	4:48
12.	"Everybody's Up To Somethin'"	2:47
13.	"Rock Your World" (Japanese Bonus Track)	4:49
14.	"The Hennepin Avenue Bridge"	3:09

=== Limited Edition ===
Special edition 12" LPs of the album were available from May 2007. These were available in three colours (red, white and blue) in a red, embossed cover.

== Chart positions ==
Album

Year	Chart	Position
2006	USA Top Independent Albums	35
2006	Japanese Billboard Chart	2
2006	Official Finnish Top Albums	33

Single

Year	Single	Chart	Position
2006	"Back Streets Of Tokyo"	Japanese Billboard Singles	6
2006	"Back Streets Of Tokyo"	Japanese Hi-Six Top 50	9

== Single ==
- "Back Streets of Tokyo" (Japan) – Credited as 'Brian Setzer Vs Hotei' (August 23, 2006)

== Personnel ==
- Brian Setzer – lead vocals, electric guitar, electric bass, banjo, ukulele
- Ronnie Crutcher – double bass
- Bernie Dresel – drums
- Stefan Kac – tuba
- Jon Duncan – organ
- Arlan Shierbaum – B-3
- Robert Chevrier – piano
- Slim Jim Phantom – drums on "Really Rockabilly"
- Tomoyasu Hotei – guitar and vocals on "Back Streets Of Tokyo", background vocals
- Julie Reiten – vocals on "Don't Say You Love Me", background vocals
- Adam Ayan – Mastering
- Jeff Peters and Brent Sigmeth – Engineering
- Zack (the knife) Hollander and Jon Diederich – Asst. Engineering
- Tomoyasu Hotei – Production on "Back Streets of Tokyo"
