= Stray Cat Strut =

- US seven-inch single

Single by Stray Cats

from the album Stray Cats/Built for Speed
- B-side: "Drink That Bottle Down" (UK); "You Don't Believe Me" (US); "What's Goin' Down (Cross That Bridge)" (Japan)
- Released: April 17, 1981 (UK); December 1982 (US)
- Genre: Rock and roll
- Length: 3:15
- Label: Arista (UK); EMI America (US)
- Songwriter: Brian Setzer
- Producer: Dave Edmunds

Stray Cats singles chronology
"Rock This Town" (1981)	"Stray Cat Strut" (1981)	"You Don't Believe Me" (1981)

"Stray Cat Strut" is the third single by American rockabilly band Stray Cats, released April 17, 1981 by Arista Records in the UK, where it peaked at No. 11 on the Singles Chart. It was taken from the band's 1981 debut album, Stray Cats. That same year, as an import, it peaked at No. 78 on the US Disco Top 80 chart.

In the US, the song was released as a single by EMI America in late 1982, and included on the Built for Speed album released that same month. During its initial release, "Stray Cat Strut" failed to crack the Billboard Hot 100 chart, peaking at number 109 on the Bubbling Under Hot 100 Singles chart in August 1982. When the band's next single, "Rock This Town", made the top 10, the record company decided to re-release "Stray Cat Strut", this time with much more success. Debuting at number 43, it was the highest new entry on the Hot 100 chart dated December 25, 1982, eventually peaking at number 3 in March 1983. The music video for the song received extensive airplay on MTV during the channel's early days. The video consisted of band members (and extras) performing in an alley while an irate resident throws things at them. It also featured scenes from the 1949 MGM cartoon Bad Luck Blackie.

In the October 1998 issue of Guitar World magazine, Brian Setzer's solo from "Stray Cat Strut" ranked No. 92 on the "Top 100 Guitar Solos of All Time" list.

== Chart history ==
=== Weekly charts ===
Chart (1982–1983)	Peak position
Canada RPM Top Singles	3
Ireland (IRMA)	8
South Africa (Springbok)	30
UK	11
US Billboard Hot 100	3
US Billboard Mainstream Rock	41
US Billboard Disco/Dance	78
US Cash Box Top 100	3

=== Year-end charts ===
Chart (1983)	Rank
Canada	34
US Billboard Hot 100	42
US Cash Box	25

== Personnel ==
- Brian Setzer - vocals, lead guitar
- Slim Jim Phantom - drums
- Lee Rocker - double bass

== Cover versions ==
Setzer later played this song with his subsequent band, the Brian Setzer Orchestra, and released live recordings on Jumpin' East of Java (2001), The Ultimate Collection (2004), Don't Mess with a Big Band (Live!) (2010) and Christmas Comes Alive! (2010).

In 1989, Spanish rockabilly band Los Renegados covered the song in Spanish as "Gato de callejón", which in turn was later covered in 2006 by Jack y Los Daniels.

In 2006, the ska punk band Reel Big Fish covered the song for a compilation titled Go Cat Go! A Tribute to Stray Cats.

It was also featured as a playable track in the 2008 music video game Guitar Hero: On Tour, and was released as downloadable content for Rock Band (though credited to Setzer as a solo artist).

== In popular culture ==
This song was used in D-TV's 1987 episode "Doggone Valentine" with clips set to scenes from The Aristocats.

On the seventh season of Dancing with the Stars, Rocco DiSpirito and Karina Smirnoff danced a foxtrot to this song. William Levy and Cheryl Burke also danced a foxtrot to this song on the 14th season of the show.

In the anime Cowboy Bebop, the song is referenced in the second episode's title: "Stray Dog Strut".
