= Jumpin' East of Java =

Live album by The Brian Setzer Orchestra
- Released: 7 August 2001
- Recorded: 22 February 2001
- Venue: Akasaka Blitz, Tokyo, Japan
- Label: Toy's Factory
- Producer: Brian Setzer

The Brian Setzer Orchestra chronology
Vavoom! (2000)	Jumpin' East of Java (2001)	Best of The Big Band (2002)

Jumpin' East of Java is the first live album from the American swing revival band The Brian Setzer Orchestra, released on 2001 in Japan only. This recording was also issued as the second disc of The Ultimate Collection. It was recorded at Akasaka Blitz, Tokyo, Japan.

== Track listing ==
All tracks composed by Brian Setzer; except where indicated

1. "Hawaii Five-O" (Mort Stevens)
2. "This Cat's On a Hot Tin Roof"
3. "The Dirty Boogie"
4. "Jumpin' East of Java"
5. "The Footloose Doll"
6. "Gloria" (Esther Navarro)
7. "Drive Like Lightning (Crash Like Thunder)"
8. "Caravan" (Duke Ellington, Irving Mills, Juan Tizol)
9. "Americano" (Renato Carosone, Brian Setzer)
10. "Sleepwalk"
11. "Stray Cat Strut"
12. "Jump, Jive an' Wail" (Louis Prima)
13. "Pennsylvania 6-5000" (Dave Bassett, Bill Finegan, Jerry Gray, Mike Himelstein, Brian Setzer, Carl Sigman)
14. "Gettin' in the Mood"
15. "Get Me to the Church on Time" (Alan Jay Lerner, Frederick Loewe)
16. "Rock This Town" (Dave Edmunds, Brian Setzer)
