= Rant n' Rave with the Stray Cats =

Studio album by Stray Cats
- Released: August 15, 1983
- Genre: Rockabilly
- Length: 30:37
- Label: EMI America
- Producer: Dave Edmunds

Stray Cats chronology
Built for Speed (1982)	Rant n' Rave with the Stray Cats (1983)	Rock Therapy (1986)

Rant n' Rave with the Stray Cats is the third studio album by American rockabilly revivalist band Stray Cats, released in 1983 by EMI America. It was produced by Dave Edmunds. The album featured the No. 5 hit "(She's) Sexy + 17", Top 40 hit "I Won't Stand in Your Way" (No. 35) and "Look at That Cadillac" (No. 68).

== Critical reception ==
Professional ratings
Review scores
Source	Rating
The Rolling Stone Album Guide	3/5 stars

In a contemporary review for The Village Voice, music critic Robert Christgau gave the album a "B−" and said that its "bigger and rawer" sound was an improvement over "Built for Speed's prettification", but felt that, despite his improved guitar playing, Brian Setzer was a poor songwriter and "a preening panderer, mythologizing his rockin' '50s with all the ignorant cynicism of a punk poser". In a retrospective review for AllMusic, Stephen Thomas Erlewine said that the album "sounded identical" to Built for Speed and was just as strong because of the hits "(She's) Sexy + 17" and "I Won't Stand in Your Way".

== Track listing ==
All tracks composed by Brian Setzer; except where indicated

1. "Rebels Rule"
2. "Too Hip, Gotta Go"
3. "Look at That Cadillac"
4. "Something's Wrong with My Radio" (Setzer, Slim Jim Phantom, Lee Rocker)
5. "18 Miles to Memphis"
6. "(She's) Sexy + 17"
7. "Dig Dirty Doggie"
8. "I Won't Stand in Your Way"
9. "Hotrod Gang"
10. "How Long You Wanna Live, Anyway?" (Setzer, Slim Jim Phantom, Lee Rocker)
11. "Lucky Charm (Ooh Wee Suzy)" (Japan Release Bonus Track)

== Personnel ==
- Brian Setzer - guitar, vocals
- Lee Rocker - bass, vocals
- Slim Jim Phantom - drums
- 14 Karat Soul - background vocals
- Mel Collins - saxophone
- Geraint Watkins - piano
- David Thurmond - background vocals
- Russell Fox II - background vocals
- Gavin Cochrane - photography

== Charts ==
Chart (1983)	Peak position
Australian Albums (Kent Music Report)	28
Canada Top Albums/CDs (RPM)	15
Dutch Albums (Album Top 100)	44
Finnish Albums (The Official Finnish Charts)	16
French Albums (SNEP)	15
German Albums (Offizielle Top 100)	25
Swedish Albums (Sverigetopplistan)	43
Swiss Albums (Schweizer Hitparade)	27
UK Albums (Official Charts)	51
US Billboard 200	14

== Certifications ==
Region	Certification	Certified units/sales
Canada (Music Canada)	Platinum	100,000^{^}
United States (RIAA)	Gold	500,000^{^}
^{^} Shipments figures based on certification alone.
