= Built for Speed (Stray Cats album) =

Compilation album by Stray Cats
- Released: June 1982
- Recorded: 1981–1982
- Genre: Rockabilly
- Length: 36:15
- Label: EMI America
- Producers: Dave Edmunds; Hein Hoven; Stray Cats

Stray Cats chronology
Gonna Ball (1981)	Built for Speed (1982)	Rant n' Rave with the Stray Cats (1983)

Built for Speed is a compilation album by American rockabilly band Stray Cats, released as the band's first album in the United States in June 1982 by EMI America Records.

Built for Speed is essentially a compilation of 12 tracks taken from the band's first two British album releases: six from Stray Cats (February 1981) and five from Gonna Ball (November 1981), plus the title track, "Built for Speed", which had not previously been released in the United Kingdom.

It was the most successful record for the band, earning a platinum certification from the Recording Industry Association of America, and with the music videos for songs such as "Rock This Town" and "Stray Cat Strut" reaching MTV regular rotation status.

== Critical reception ==
Professional ratings
Review scores
Source	Rating
AllMusic	4.5/5 stars
Rolling Stone	2/5 stars
The Village Voice	B−

Reviewing Built for Speed for The Village Voice, music critic Robert Christgau said that, despite Brian Setzer's exotic, modernistic guitar touches, "the mild vocals just ain't rockabilly. You know how it is when white boys strive for authenticity—'57 V-8 my ass". Rolling Stone's David Fricke found Stray Cats' self-production "spiritless" and their original compositions "mostly average", remarking that the band only "gets it dead right" on the tracks produced by Dave Edmunds.

In a retrospective review, Mark Deming of AllMusic wrote that the melodies and playing are strong enough to withstand datedness on what is "song-for-song the group's strongest album, despite the cut-and-paste manner in which it was created".

== Track listing ==
Side one
No.	Title	Writer(s)	Producer(s)	Length
1.	"Rock This Town*"	Brian Setzer	Dave Edmunds	3:24
2.	"Built for Speed"	Setzer	Stray Cats	2:53
3.	"Rev It Up & Go†"	Setzer	Stray Cats; Hein Hoven	2:27
4.	"Stray Cat Strut*"	Setzer	Edmunds	3:15
5.	"Little Miss Prissy†"	Setzer	Stray Cats; Hein Hoven	2:59
6.	"Rumble in Brighton*"	Setzer; Slim Jim Phantom	Stray Cats; Hein Hoven	3:11

Side two
No.	Title	Writer(s)	Producer(s)	Length
1.	"Runaway Boys*"	Setzer; Phantom	Edmunds	2:58
2.	"Lonely Summer Nights†"	Setzer	Stray Cats; Hein Hoven	3:16
3.	"Double Talkin' Baby*"	Danny Wolfe	Edmunds	3:02
4.	"You Don't Believe Me†"	Setzer; Phantom; Lee Rocker	Stray Cats; Hein Hoven	2:54
5.	"Jeanie, Jeanie, Jeanie*"	George Motola; Ricky Page	Edmunds	2:18
6.	"Baby Blue Eyes†"	Paul Burlison; Johnny Burnette	Stray Cats; Hein Hoven	2:47

- * originally released on Stray Cats
- † originally released on Gonna Ball

Note: "Jeanie, Jeanie, Jeanie" is often miscredited as having been written by Mike Chapman, who recorded a song of the same name with his band Tangerine Peel. However, Chapman's "Jeanie, Jeanie, Jeanie" is a completely different song from the one the Stray Cats recorded; they just happen to share the same title. The Stray Cats' "Jeanie, Jeanie, Jeanie" was originally performed by Eddie Cochran, and was written by George Motola and Ricky Page (regardless of what the original Built for Speed album or other various Stray Cats collections may claim).

== Personnel ==
Credits are adapted from the album's liner notes.

Stray Cats

- Brian Setzer – guitars, lap steel guitar, vocals
- Slim Jim Phantom – drums, vocals
- Lee Rocker – bass, electric bass, vocals

Production

- Dave Edmunds – production
- Hein Hoven – production
- Stray Cats – production
- Wally Traugott – mastering

Design

- Charles Novick Studios – design
- Gavin Cochrane – front cover photography
- Francesca – design
- Guido Harari – back cover photography
- Sheila Rock – back cover photography

== Charts ==
Chart (1982–83)	Peak position
Canada Top Albums/CDs (RPM)	1
US Billboard 200	2

== Certifications ==
Region	Certification	Certified units/sales
Canada (Music Canada)	2× Platinum	200,000^{^}
United States (RIAA)	Platinum	1,000,000^{^}
^{^} Shipments figures based on certification alone.
