= Stray Cats (album) =

Studio album by Stray Cats
- Released: February 1981
- Recorded: 1980–1981
- Studio: Eden Studios, Chiswick, London; Jam Studios, London N4
- Genre: Rockabilly; rock and roll
- Length: 37:11
- Label: Arista
- Producer: Dave Edmunds; Brian Setzer; Stray Cats

Stray Cats chronology
Stray Cats (1981)	Gonna Ball (1981)

Professional ratings
Review scores
Source	Rating
AllMusic	4.5/5 stars
Record Mirror	5/5 stars

Stray Cats is the first studio album by American rockabilly band Stray Cats, first released in the United Kingdom by Arista Records in February 1981. It was produced by the band and Dave Edmunds.

The album was successful in Britain, peaking at No. 6 on the UK Albums Chart, and produced the UK Singles Chart top 40 hits "Runaway Boys" (No. 9), "Rock This Town" (No. 9) and "Stray Cat Strut" (No. 11). The Rock and Roll Hall of Fame later listed "Rock This Town" as one of the "500 Songs that Shaped Rock and Roll".

The fifth track on the album, "Storm the Embassy" was based on the song "Boys Having Babies" recorded in 1979 by Brian Setzer's previous band The Bloodless Pharaohs. The lyrics were subsequently rewritten about the Iran hostage crisis of 1979–80.

The album was only issued in the United States after the success of the band's first American album, 1982's Built for Speed. However, six of the songs from Stray Cats ("Rock This Town", "Stray Cat Strut", "Rumble in Brighton", "Runaway Boys", "Double Talkin' Baby" and "Jeanie, Jeanie, Jeanie") were already included on Built for Speed.

== Track listing ==
No.	Title	Writer(s)	Producer(s)	Length
1.	"Runaway Boys"	Brian Setzer; James McDonnell	Dave Edmunds	3:03
2.	"Fishnet Stockings"	Setzer	Setzer; Stray Cats	2:25
3.	"Ubangi Stomp"	Charles Underwood	Setzer; Stray Cats	3:14
4.	"Jeanie, Jeanie, Jeanie"	George Motola; Ricky Page	Edmunds	2:21
5.	"Storm the Embassy"	Setzer; Phantom	Setzer; Stray Cats	4:08
6.	"Rock This Town"	Setzer	Edmunds	3:28
7.	"Rumble in Brighton"	Setzer; Phantom	Setzer; Stray Cats	3:16
8.	"Stray Cat Strut"	Setzer	Edmunds	3:16
9.	"Crawl Up and Die"	Brian Feli; Jim Feli	Edmunds	3:13
10.	"Double Talkin' Baby"	Danny Wolfe	Edmunds	3:05
11.	"My One Desire"	Dorsey Burnette	Edmunds	2:57
12.	"Wild Saxophone"	Roy Montrell; John Marascalco; Robert Blackwell	Setzer; Stray Cats	3:01

== Personnel ==
Credits are adapted from the album's liner notes.

Stray Cats

- Brian Setzer – guitar, vocals
- Slim Jim Phantom – drums
- Lee Rocker – bass

Additional musicians

- Gary Barnacle – saxophone

Production

- Aldo Bocca – engineering
- Dave Edmunds – production
- Hein Hoven – engineering
- Neil – tape operation
- Nick – tape operation
- Brian Setzer – production
- Stray Cats – production

Design

- Gavin Cochrane – photography
- Chalkie Davies – photography
- Alain de la Mata – photography
- Chris Gabrin – photography
- Malcolm Garrett – sleeve design
- Toshi Yajima – photography

== Charts ==
=== Weekly charts ===
Chart (1981)	Peak position
Australian Albums (Kent Music Report)	41
Dutch Albums (Album Top 100)	4
Finnish Albums (The Official Finnish Charts)	1
French Albums (SNEP)	1
New Zealand Albums (RMNZ)	2
Norwegian Albums (VG-lista)	24
Swedish Albums (Sverigetopplistan)	3
UK Albums (OCC)	6

=== Year-end charts ===
Chart (1981)	Position
Dutch Albums (Album Top 100)	32
New Zealand Albums (RMNZ)	12

== Certifications ==
Region	Certification	Certified units/sales
New Zealand (RMNZ)	Platinum	15,000^{^}
United Kingdom (BPI)	Gold	100,000^{^}
^{^} Shipments figures based on certification alone.
