= Rock Therapy (disambiguation) =

Rock Therapy may refer to:

- Rock Therapy, an album by various artists including Queen guitarist Brian May, Rolling Stones drummer Charlie Watts, plus a number of guest vocalists including Sam Brown, Andy Fairweather-Low, Paul Rodgers and Lulu.
- Rock Therapy (Stray Cats album), an album by Stray Cats
- "Rock Therapy", a song by Johnny Burnette and the Rock 'n Roll Trio
