= The Tomcats =

The Tomcats may refer to one of several bands.

== English band ==
=== First English band ===
The Tomcats were a band from Perivale, England in the early to mid sixties. The founder members were Tom Newman (later founder of Virgin Records with Richard Branson, and producer of Mike Oldfield's Tubular Bells), Pete Cook (later luthier to John Entwistle, and creator of the 'Ned Callan' guitar range with Tom Newman), Allan James (later bass player with psychedelic band July with Newman and Jackson), and Chris Jackson, drummer - (The Devil Rides Out).

=== Second English band ===
In the late 1960s, there was a British band called The Tomcats, which were produced by Bill Wyman, bass player with The Rolling Stones. They made some recordings, including renditions of The Stones' hits, such as "19th Nervous Breakdown". Terry Taylor, who was one of the guitarists for the band, is currently a member of Bill Wyman's Rhythm Kings.

== American band ==
Tomcats was the name of Brian Setzer's first rockabilly group, before transforming to the widely known Stray Cats. With Brian Setzer on guitar and vocals, Gary Setzer on drums and Bob Beecher on bass, the trio began to play clubs at Long Island in 1977. At the time Brian Setzer and Bob Beecher were also participating at another group, named the Bloodless Pharaohs, which played "art rock" music (as described by Gary Setzer). While the Bloodless Pharaohs were playing in and out New York, the Tomcats were still holding forth out on Long Island developing the sound and style that would mark the Stray Cats.

The Bloodless Pharaohs were going in one direction, while Brian Setzer was more interested in rockabilly. This resulted in the break-up of the Tomcats. Afterwards, Brian Setzer began working with a couple of Long Island buddies, Jim McDonnell (later known as Slim Jim Phantom, playing drums) and Lee Drucker (later known as Lee Rocker, playing bass). In the summer of 1980, the trio sold their equipment and moved to London, taking the name Stray Cats.

=== High School Confidential ===
Recorded live at TKs Place on May 24, 1980. This is Volume 2 of 7 live recordings, licensed by Gary Setzer and issued by Collectibles in 1997.

Track listing

1. "Pretty, Pretty, Baby" - 4:26
2. "Drugstore Rock R Roll" - 4:43
3. "Ubangi Stomp" - 3:32
4. "Round And Round" - 3:58
5. "High School Confidential" - 3:34
6. "Every Body's Moving Tonight" - 4:18
7. "Pink Thunderbird" - 2:54
8. "Hallelujah, I Love Her So" - 2:17
9. "Say Mama" - 3:00
10. "My One Desire" - 4:07
11. "Hold Me, Hug Me, Rock Me" - 3:46

=== Second American Band ===
In the early 1990s, Icon members Dan Wexler and Pat Dixon, former King Kobra /Lizzy Borden guitarist Dave Henzerling and Asphalt Ballet singer Tommy Dean formed a band called Tomcats. The band played in the Los Angeles area for a few years and recorded demos. There aren't any official releases by this band though.

== See also ==
- Tom Cat (band)
