= The Dirty Boogie =

Studio album by the Brian Setzer Orchestra
- Released: June 23, 1998
- Studios: The Village Recorder, Ocean Way Recording, Los Angeles, CA
- Genres: Swing; jump blues; rockabilly; rock and roll
- Length: 49:24
- Label: Interscope
- Producer: Peter Collins

The Brian Setzer Orchestra chronology
Guitar Slinger (1996)	The Dirty Boogie (1998)	Vavoom! (2000)

Professional ratings
Review scores
Source	Rating
Allmusic	4/5 stars
Entertainment Weekly	B+
Los Angeles Times	2.5/4 stars
Rolling Stone	2.5/5 stars
The Village Voice	C−

The Dirty Boogie is the third album from the swing band the Brian Setzer Orchestra. The album is considered as a breakthrough for the band, with their first single being a cover of Louis Prima's "Jump Jive an' Wail", which Prima had made popular in 1956 and included in his album The Wildest!. The release of the single came along after a Gap advertising campaign that featured Prima's original recording of the song. Each helped to propel the larger swing revival throughout the late 1990s and early 2000s. Seven of the album's tracks are covers of songs written and originally made popular between 1952 and 1962.

== Structure and release ==
In addition to Prima's "Jump Jive An' Wail", covers include "This Old House" by Stuart Hamblen, "Since I Don't Have You" by the Skyliners, "Nosey Joe" popularized by Bull Moose Jackson, and "As Long As I'm Singin'" by Bobby Darin. "You're the Boss", penned by Leiber and Stoller in 1961, is the album's seventh track, a duet featuring singer (and labelmate) Gwen Stefani; an earlier popular recording of the tune paired Elvis Presley and Ann-Margret. The eighth track, "Rock This Town", is a cover of a song originally recorded in 1981 by Setzer's previous band, the Stray Cats. "Hollywood Nocturne" was a discarded track from Setzer's previous album, Guitar Slinger.

The album also features a cover of the instrumental "Sleep Walk", made popular originally by songwriters and performers Santo & Johnny Farina in 1959. Setzer's arrangement won a Grammy Award the following year for best pop instrumental recording.

== Album art ==
The illustration and logo for The Dirty Boogie was created by Sir Richard Wentworth, using techniques such as pen and ink linework and cut rubylith sheets. The album cover began life as a show poster designed by Wentworth to advertise a Brian Setzer Orchestra concert at Detroit's State Theater (currently The Fillmore Detroit). After Brian Setzer saw the poster, he commissioned Wentworth to reformat the poster and to create a new logo for the band. The angular, kinetic style employed in Wentworth's illustration sparked a trend of identifying the music of the swing revival with the visual signifiers of the cartoon modern style (a type of dynamic, minimal design commonly used in 1950s and 1960s limited animation). Wentworth's retro logotype is still an essential part of the Brian Setzer Orchestra's brand identity and has inspired a commercial font called "Swinger". Wentworth also illustrated the covers for Setzer's Best of The Big Band (Japan Only CD), Boogie Woogie Christmas and Christmas Rocks! CDs, and designed the logo for The Ultimate Christmas Collection CD.

== Track listing ==
All tracks are written by Brian Setzer, except where noted.

No.	Title	Writer(s)	Length
1.	"This Cat's on a Hot Tin Roof"		2:19
2.	"The Dirty Boogie"		3:13
3.	"This Old House"	Stuart Hamblen	3:06
4.	"Let's Live It Up"		3:41
5.	"Sleepwalk" (instrumental)	Santo Farina; Johnny Farina; Ann Farina	3:49
6.	"Jump Jive an' Wail"	Louis Prima	2:53
7.	"You're the Boss" (featuring Gwen Stefani)	Jerry Leiber; Mike Stoller	3:43
8.	"Rock This Town"		6:37
9.	"Since I Don't Have You"	Jimmy Beaumont; Wally Lester; Joe Verscharen; Janet Vogel; Jackie Taylor; Joseph Rock; Lennie Martin	4:09
10.	"Switchblade 327"		3:30
11.	"Nosey Joe"	Leiber; Stoller	2:45
12.	"Hollywood Nocturne"		5:36
13.	"As Long as I'm Singin'"	Bobby Darin	4:03
Total length:			49:24

== Personnel ==
=== Musicians ===
- Brian Setzer – guitar, vocals
- Ernie Nunez, Tony Garnier – bass
- Bernie Dresel – drums, percussion
- Don Roberts, Ray Herrmann, Rick Rossi, Steve Marsh, Tim Misica – saxophone
- George McMulen, Mark Jones, Michael Vlatkovich, Robbie Hioki – trombone
- Dan Fornero, Dennis Farias, John Fumo, Kevin Norton – trumpet

=== Additional musicians ===
- Gwen Stefani – guest vocalist (track 7)
- Mark W. Winchester – bass (track 7)
- Eddie Nichols, Meghan Ivey – backing vocals (track 6)
- Bob Parr – bass (track 12)
- Roger Burn – piano (track 12)
- Bob Sandman, George Shelby, Steve Fowler – saxophone (track 12)
- Charlie Biggs, Stan Watkins – trumpet (track 12)

=== Technical ===
- Peter Collins – producer
- Phil Ramone – producer (track 12)
- John Holbrook – engineer
- Allen Sides – engineer (track 12)
- Cliff Norrel, David Nottingham – assistant engineers
- Brad Haehnel – assistant engineer (track 12)

== Charts ==
Chart (1998–99)	Peak position
Canada Top Albums/CDs (RPM)	32
Dutch Albums (Album Top 100)	36
French Albums (SNEP)	35
German Albums (Offizielle Top 100)	55
US Billboard 200	9

== Certifications ==
Region	Certification	Certified units/sales
Canada (Music Canada)	Platinum	100,000^{^}
United States (RIAA)	2× Platinum	2,000,000^{^}
^{^} Shipments figures based on certification alone.
