= Choo Choo Hot Fish =

Studio album by Stray Cats
- Released: 1992
- Studio: Pyramid, Lookout Mountain, Tennessee
- Genre: Rockabilly
- Length: 43:05
- Label: JRS
- Producer: Dave Edmunds

Stray Cats chronology
Let's Go Faster (1990)	Choo Choo Hot Fish (1992)	Original Cool (1993)

Singles from Choo Choo Hot Fish
- 1. "Elvis on Velvet" Released: 1992; 2. "Cry Baby" Released: 1992

Choo Choo Hot Fish is the seventh studio album by the American rockabilly band Stray Cats, released in 1992. The first single was "Elvis on Velvet". The band supported the album with a North American tour.

The album was named for a soul food fish restaurant, since demolished, at Market and Main streets in Chattanooga, Tennessee, near what is now the Chattanooga Choo-Choo Hotel.

== Production ==
The album was produced by Dave Edmunds. The band had started an album with Nile Rodgers, but returned to Edmunds to capture their usual sound. Stray Cats used electronic drums and bass on some tracks.

"Jade Idol" is an instrumental. "Can't Go Back to Memphis" was written by Randy Bachman. "Sleepwalk" is a cover of the Santo & Johnny song.

== Critical reception ==
Professional ratings
Review scores
Source	Rating
AllMusic	2/5 stars
Calgary Herald	C+
Vancouver Sun	3.5/5 stars

The Calgary Herald wrote that "it's hard to figure out what exactly is being revived ... Are they trying to remind us of the traditional days of rock 'n' roll or just their own 14 1/2 minutes of fame?" The Vancouver Sun opined that "the band flies through tunes at hopped-up rockabilly speed with passion and style."

The Chicago Tribune concluded that Stray Cats' "trademark rockabilly is less derivative and static, and to it they add some eerie 'Blue Velvet'-styled rock ballads, a smart dash of swing and a touch of lively country rock." Guitar Player determined that the guitars "spit and howl with unabated intensity."

== Track listing ==
1. "Elvis on Velvet" (Monty Byrom, Tom Kimmel) - 4:25
2. "Cry Baby" (Michael Lanning, Rick Bell) - 3:51
3. "Please Don't Touch" (Heath, Robinson) - 3:06
4. "Sleepwalk" (John Farina, Santo Farina) - 3:32
5. "Lust 'n' Love" (Bill Carter, Brian Setzer, Ruth Ellen Ellsworth) - 3:47
6. "Beautiful Blues" (Setzer, Larson Paine) - 3:03
7. "Cross of Love" (Setzer, Paine) - 4:15
8. "Can't Go Back to Memphis" (Randy Bachman) - 4:54
9. "Jade Idol" (Setzer, Lee Rocker, Slim Jim Phantom) - 3:18
10. "My Heart Is a Liar" (Setzer, Rocker, Phantom) - 3:49
11. "Mystery Train" (Junior Parker) - 5:06

== Personnel ==
- Brian Setzer – guitar, lap steel, vocals
- Lee Rocker – upright bass, vocals
- Slim Jim Phantom – drums, vocals
- Dave Edmunds – guitar, vocals on "Cry Baby"

== Charts ==
Chart (1992)	Peak position
Finnish Albums (The Official Finnish Charts)	19
