= Gonna Ball =

Studio album by Stray Cats
- Released: November 1981
- Genres: Rockabilly; rock and roll
- Length: 32:46
- Label: Arista
- Producers: Stray Cats, Hein Hoven

Stray Cats chronology
Stray Cats (1981)	Gonna Ball (1981)	Built for Speed (1982)

Professional ratings
Review scores
Source	Rating
AllMusic	link
Rock 82	(favorable)

Gonna Ball is the second studio album by American rockabilly band Stray Cats, first released in the UK by Arista Records in November 1981. The album was produced by the band and Hein Hoven. It went silver in the UK.

Five of the album's tracks ("Baby Blue Eyes", "Little Miss Prissy", "You Don't Believe Me", "Rev It Up and Go" and "Lonely Summer Nights") were later included on the band's first American album, Built for Speed (1982). Only "You Don't Believe Me" charted in the UK, reaching No. 57.

== Track listing ==
All tracks composed by Brian Setzer; except where indicated

1. "Baby Blue Eyes" (Johnny Burnette, Paul Burlison)
2. "Little Miss Prissy"
3. "Wasn't That Good" (Wynonie Harris)
4. "Cryin' Shame"
5. "(She'll Stay Just) One More Day" (Slim Jim Phantom, Lee Rocker)
6. "What's Goin' Down (Cross That Bridge)" (bonus track on Japanese editions)
7. "You Don't Believe Me" (Setzer, Lee Rocker)
8. "Gonna Ball" (Allen Bunn)
9. "Wicked Whisky"
10. "Rev It Up and Go"
11. "Lonely Summer Nights"
12. "Crazy Mixed-Up Kid"

== Personnel ==
Stray Cats

- Brian Setzer - guitar, vocals
- Lee Rocker - bass, vocals
- Slim Jim Phantom - drums, vocals

Additional personnel

- John Locke - keyboards
- Steve Poncar - saxophone
- Ian Stewart - keyboards
- Brian McDonald - harmonica
- Lee Allen - tenor saxophone
- Gavin Cochrane - photography

== Charts ==
Chart (1981–82)	Peak position
Australian Albums (Kent Music Report)	61
Finnish Albums (The Official Finnish Charts)	6
French Albums (SNEP)	4
Italian Albums (Musica e Dischi)	22
New Zealand Albums (RMNZ)	24
Swedish Albums (Sverigetopplistan)	40
UK Albums (Official Charts)	48

== Certifications ==
Region	Certification	Certified units/sales
France (SNEP)	Gold	100,000^{*}
United Kingdom (BPI)	Silver	60,000^{^}
^{*} Sales figures based on certification alone.^{^} Shipments figures based on certification alone.
