= 40 (Stray Cats album) =

Studio album by Stray Cats
- Released: May 24, 2019
- Recorded: 2018
- Studio: Blackbird Studios (Nashville, TN)
- Genre: Rockabilly
- Length: 35:39
- Label: Surfdog Records
- Producer: Peter Collins

Stray Cats chronology
Original Cool (1993)	40 (2019)

40 is the ninth studio album by American rockabilly band Stray Cats, released in May 2019 by Surfdog Records. It is their first studio album in 26 years since Original Cool in 1993. The album was recorded, mixed, and mastered in Nashville, Tennessee. It is the last album to be produced by Peter Collins before his death in 2024.

== Critical reception ==
Professional ratings
Review scores
Source	Rating
AllMusic	3.5/5 stars

Joe Bosso of Guitar Player said: "The album brims with bracing, stripped-down rockers like 'Cat Fight (Over a Dog Like Me),' 'Mean Pickin' Mama' and 'Devil Train,' and every track boasts a widescreen riff and virtuoso guitar solo. But the band also serves up some new sounds with the riff rocker 'Cry Danger' (co-written with Mike Campbell) and the punk-like 'I'll Be Looking Out for You.'"

Kenneth Partridge of Billboard said: "Four decades later, Stray Cats are ready to 'Rock It Off' with the same three basic ingredients they've always used: Setzer's twangy Gretsch guitar, drummer Slim Jim Phantom's elemental thumping and Lee Rocker's expertly slapped upright bass... On the standout 'Cry Danger,' the Cats venture out of their '50s comfort zone and move boldly into '60s garage-rock territory. The track features an intro guitar riff that'll make any Beatles fan instantly think of 'Day Tripper.'"

== Track listing ==
No.	Title	Writer(s)	Length
1.	"Cat Fight (Over a Dog Like Me)"	Brian Setzer, Mike Himelstein	2:14
2.	"Rock It Off"	Setzer, Himelstein	2:59
3.	"I've Got Love If You Want It"	Setzer	3:04
4.	"Cry Danger"	Setzer, Himelstein, Mike Campbell	3:09
5.	"I Attract Trouble"	Setzer, Himelstein	3:42
6.	"Three Time's a Charm"	Setzer, Himelstein	2:07
7.	"That's Messed Up"	Setzer, Himelstein	3:56
8.	"When Nothing's Going Right"	Lee Rocker (as Leon Drucker)	3:01
9.	"Desperado"	Setzer	2:55
10.	"Mean Pickin' Mama"	Setzer	2:40
11.	"I'll Be Looking Out for You"	Setzer	2:35
12.	"Devil Train"	Setzer	3:17
Total length:			35:39

== Personnel ==
Stray Cats

- Brian Setzer – guitars, lead vocals
- Slim Jim Phantom – drums, vocals
- Lee Rocker – bass guitar, vocals

== Charts ==
Chart (2019)	Peak position
Australian Digital Albums (ARIA)	39
Austrian Albums (Ö3 Austria)	25
Belgian Albums (Ultratop Flanders)	26
Belgian Albums (Ultratop Wallonia)	16
Dutch Albums (Album Top 100)	26
Finnish Albums (Suomen virallinen lista)	7
French Albums (SNEP)	17
German Albums (Offizielle Top 100)	6
Japanese Albums (Oricon)	20
Scottish Albums (OCC)	27
Spanish Albums (PROMUSICAE)	19
Swiss Albums (Schweizer Hitparade)	7
UK Albums (OCC)	53
UK Independent Albums (OCC)	7
US Billboard 200	93
US Independent Albums (Billboard)	3
US Top Album Sales (Billboard)	5
US Top Rock Albums (Billboard)	1
