= Jeannie Jeannie Jeannie =

1958 single by Eddie Cochran

Single by Eddie Cochran

from the album Legendary Masters Series
- B-side: "Pocketful of Hearts"
- Released: January 1958
- Recorded: January 12, 1958
- Genre: Rock and roll
- Length: 2:18
- Label: Liberty
- Songwriters: George Motola; Rickie Page
- Producer: Eddie Cochran

Eddie Cochran singles chronology
"Twenty Flight Rock" (1957)	"Jeannie Jeannie Jeannie" (1958)	"Pretty Girl" (1958)

"Jeannie Jeannie Jeannie" is a song by Eddie Cochran recorded and released as a single in January 1958 on Liberty Records. It was a minor hit for Cochran and stalled at number 94 on the Billboard charts. "Jeannie, Jeannie, Jeannie" was posthumously released in the United Kingdom in 1961 on the London Records label and rose to number 31.

== Composition and release ==
"Jeannie Jeannie Jeannie" was written by George Motola and Rickie Page. The song was first written as "Johnny, Johnny, Johnny" for The Georgettes, but they never recorded it.

The recording session for the song was lengthy and difficult. It was released in January 1958 on Liberty Records with a B-side single "Pocketful of Hearts".

== Personnel ==
- Eddie Cochran: vocal, guitar
- Conny 'Guybo' Smith: electric bass
- Earl Palmer: drums
- Ray Johnson: piano (Cochran's official website lists Johnson someone who possibly participated in "Jeannie Jeannie Jeannie" recording session)

== Covers ==
The Stray Cats recorded a version of "Jeanie Jeanie Jeanie" which was released on their first UK album Stray Cats in 1981. The song was also released on their debut US album Built for Speed. The song was often featured in their live shows and several live versions are available. The Stray Cats' version features rewritten and raunchier lyrics than the Eddie Cochran version.

- Vince Taylor And His Play-Boys (as Jenny, Jenny, Jenny) - 1962
- Showaddywaddy
- Teddy & The Tigers - 1978
- The Inmates - 1979
- The Firebirds - 1991
- The Real Kids - 1993
- Darrel Higham - 1997, 2004. UK rockabilly singer and noted Eddie Cochran expert Darrel Higham recorded "Jeanie Jeanie Jeanie" for his 1997 album The Cochran Connection and another version in 2004 for Midnight Commotion.
- The Top Cats - 2004

== Chart performance ==
Chart (1958)	Peak position
UK Singles Chart (1961)	31
US Billboard Hot 100	94
