= Blast Off! (Stray Cats album) =

Studio album by Stray Cats
- Released: 1989
- Genres: Rock, rockabilly, pop
- Length: 30:24
- Label: EMI America
- Producer: Dave Edmunds

Stray Cats chronology
Rock Therapy (1986)	Blast Off! (1989)	Rock This Town: Best of the Stray Cats (1990)

Blast Off! is the fifth studio album by the American rockabilly revivalist band Stray Cats, released in 1989. It marked a reunion of the band, after three years of solo endeavors; the band's previous album, 1986's Rock Therapy, was produced to fulfill a record contract.

The album peaked at No. 111 on the Billboard 200. It peaked at No. 58 on the UK Albums Chart. The first single was "Bring It Back Again".

The band supported Blast Off! by touring with Stevie Ray Vaughan.

== Production ==
The album was produced by Dave Edmunds, who recorded it in two weeks. The band began work on the songs at Brian Setzer's house, in the summer of 1988. "Gene and Eddie" is a tribute to Gene Vincent and Eddie Cochran.

== Critical reception ==
Professional ratings
Review scores
Source	Rating
AllMusic	2/5 stars
Chicago Tribune	3/4 stars
Los Angeles Times	1.5/5 stars
MusicHound Rock: The Essential Album Guide	4/5 stars
Orlando Sentinel	4/5 stars
Ottawa Citizen	4/5 stars
Record Collector	2/5 stars
The Rolling Stone Album Guide	2/5 stars
San Jose Mercury News	1.5/4 stars
The Virgin Encyclopedia of Eighties Music	2/5 stars

Spin thought that the album "sounds even more half-hearted than the Stray Cats original (so to speak) take on the rockabilly revival." The Boston Globe determined that "Setzer can still play rave-up guitar with the best of them, though this album has time warp written all over it." The Ottawa Citizen noted that "the humor is there; they give Mr. Spock a pompadour during a ride around the galaxy, then walk on the moon in blue suede shoes." The San Jose Mercury News wrote that "if the way in which the Cats once played with and to nostalgia was original—in a secondhand sense—it now seems only dreary and rehashed."

The Orlando Sentinel stated that "Edmunds gives the Cats a new lease by rekindling the fire that dimmed after their debut album." The Calgary Herald declared that "it rocks and that's why Blast Off is a fun rerun of the party-hearty sound that saw the Stray Cats top the charts in 1982–'83." The Los Angeles Times panned the album, writing that "these un-cool Cats should feel lucky they even get a second chance—especially since they show no sign of being more than a one-dimensional act." The Gazette opined that "the Stray Cats have returned to their original launching point—as a good club band with no real vision."

AllMusic wrote: "Featuring a set of pleasant, but unexciting, songs, Blast Off indicated that the Stray Cats' revved-up rockabilly ran out of gas quickly." Record Collector concluded that "there’s a fiery venom to the galloping title track ... and then there’s way too much filler." MusicHound Rock: The Essential Album Guide called the album "unjustly ignored."

== Track listing ==
No.	Title	Length
1.	"Blast Off"
2.	"Gina"
3.	"Everybody Needs Rock 'n' Roll"
4.	"Gene and Eddie"
5.	"Rockabilly Rules"
6.	"Bring It Back Again"
7.	"Slip, Slip, Slippin' In"
8.	"Rockabilly World"
9.	"Rockin' All Over the Place"
10.	"Nine Lives"

== Charts ==
Chart (1989)	Peak position
Australian Albums (ARIA)	90
Canada Top Albums/CDs (RPM)	80
Finnish Albums (The Official Finnish Charts)	7
French Albums (SNEP)	45
UK Albums (Official Charts)	58
US Billboard 200	111
