= Phantom, Rocker & Slick =

American band

- Genres: Rock & roll, rockabilly
- Years active: 1983–1986
- Label: EMI
- Spinoff of: Stray Cats
- Past members: Slim Jim Phantom; Lee Rocker; Earl Slick

Phantom, Rocker & Slick was an American rock band active in the mid-1980s. The bandmembers were drummer Slim Jim Phantom, bassist Lee Rocker, and guitarist Earl Slick. Phantom and Rocker had previously played together as members of the Stray Cats. They released two albums, Phantom, Rocker & Slick and Cover Girl, on EMI Records before disbanding.

== History ==
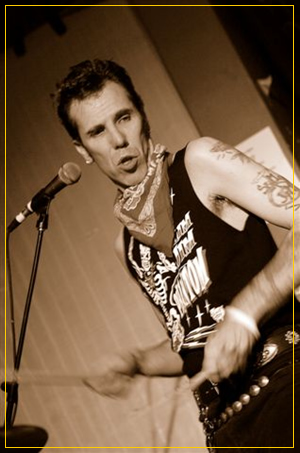
Drummer Slim Jim Phantom

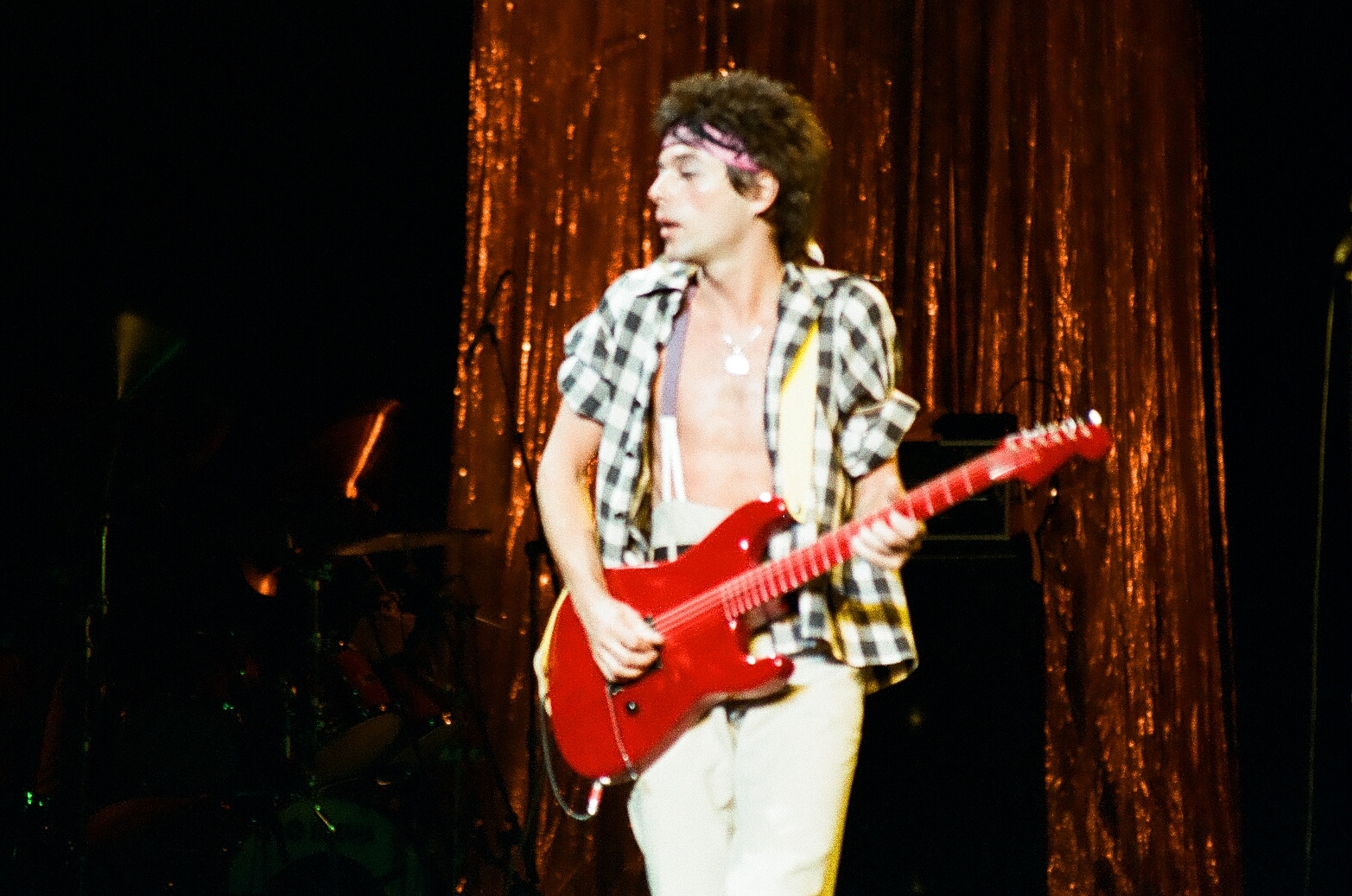
Guitarist Earl Slick

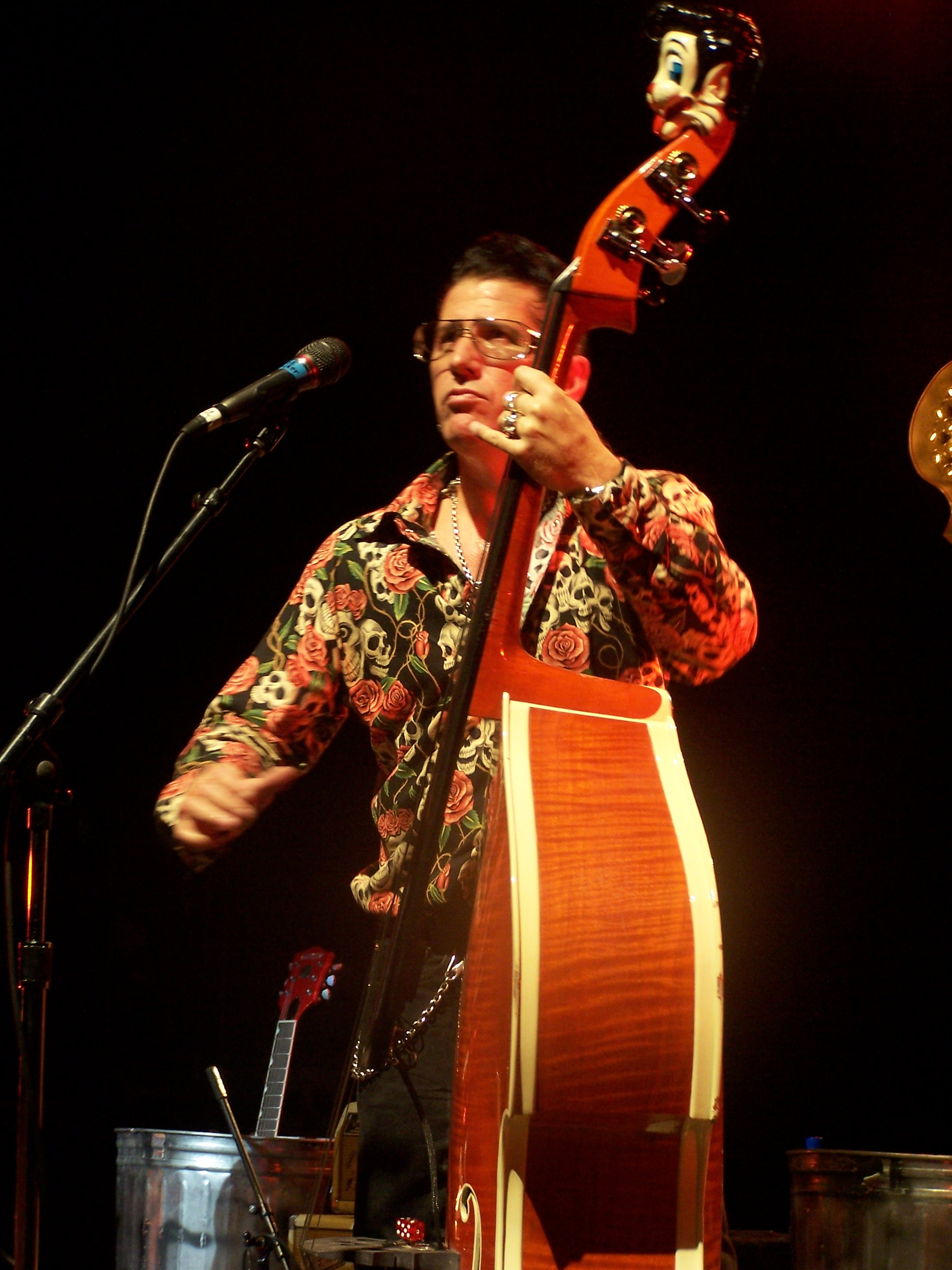
Lee Rocker on the double bass

Slim Jim Phantom and Lee Rocker grew up together in New York City. They began writing songs when they were 12 years old. Along with Brian Setzer, they formed the Stray Cats. When the Stray Cats broke up, they began looking for a new guitarist and met sessionman Earl Slick at a music trade show, leading to the formation of the band. Years earlier, Rocker had been a fan of Slick's guitar work on David Bowie's David Live. Slick also played on Bowie's Station to Station and John Lennon's Double Fantasy.

Their first release, 1985's self-titled Phantom, Rocker & Slick, was produced by Michael Barbiero & Steve Thompson and was a moderate success, peaking at 62 on the Billboard 200. Its first single was "Men Without Shame" and was written in ten minutes. It did well on the Top Rock Tracks chart, peaking at number 7. It was played in the active rotation on MTV. The single "My Mistake" also appeared on the Top Rock Tracks chart, peaking at 33, and featured Keith Richards of The Rolling Stones on guitar. Nicky Hopkins also made a guest appearance on the album, playing piano on the tracks "No Regrets," "Lonely Actions," and "Time Is On My Hands."

The release of their second album, Cover Girl in 1986, was the beginning of the end for the band. It did poorly, reaching only 181 on the Billboard 200 and they soon broke up, with Phantom and Rocker rejoining the Stray Cats and Slick returning to session work.

== Members ==
- Slim Jim Phantom – drums, vocals
- Lee Rocker – double bass, lead vocals
- Earl Slick – guitar, vocals

== Discography ==
- Phantom, Rocker & Slick 1985 (EMI)
- Cover Girl 1986 (EMI)

== Charts ==
=== Albums ===
Date	Album	Chart	Peak
30 November 1985	Phantom, Rocker & Slick	Billboard 200	62
25 October 1986	Cover Girl	Billboard 200	181

=== Singles ===
Date	Single	Chart	Peak
23 November 1985	"Men Without Shame"	Top Rock Tracks	7
15 February 1986	"My Mistake"	Top Rock Tracks	33
