= Vavoom! =

Studio album by The Brian Setzer Orchestra
- Released: August 1, 2000
- Length: 43:18
- Label: Interscope
- Producers: Glen Ballard, Peter Collins, Dave Darling

The Brian Setzer Orchestra chronology
The Dirty Boogie (1998)	Vavoom! (2000)	Jumpin' East of Java (2001)

Professional ratings
Review scores
Source	Rating
Allmusic	2.5/5 stars

Vavoom! is the fourth studio album by the swing band The Brian Setzer Orchestra. It was released in 2000 on Interscope Records.

== Track listing ==
All tracks composed by Brian Setzer; except where indicated.

1. "Pennsylvania 6-5000" (Jerry Gray, Bill Finegan, Carl Sigman, Setzer, Mike Himmelstein)
2. "Jumpin' East of Java"
3. "Americano" (Renato Carosone, Nicola "Nisa" Salerno, Setzer, Mike Himmelstein)
4. "If You Can't Rock Me"
5. "Gettin' In the Mood" (Wingy Manone, Joe Garland, Andy Razaf, Setzer, Mike Himmelstein)
6. "Drive Like Lightning (Crash Like Thunder)" (Setzer, Mark Winchester)
7. "Mack the Knife" (Kurt Weill, Bertolt Brecht, Marc Blitzstein)
8. "Caravan" (Duke Ellington, Juan Tizol, Irving Mills)
9. "The Footloose Doll"
10. "From Here to Eternity" (Setzer, Rick Bell)
11. "That's the Kind of Sugar Papa Likes"
12. "'49 Mercury Blues"
13. "Jukebox"
14. "Gloria" (Esther Navarro)
15. "Rock-A-Beatin' Boogie" (Bill Haley) (Japan only bonus track)

== Personnel ==
- Brian Setzer - guitar, vocals
- Bernie Dresel - drums, percussion
- Tony Garnier - bass
- Mark Winchester - bass
- Ray Herrmann - saxophone
- Tim Misica - saxophone
- Don Roberts - saxophone
- Jim Youngstrom - saxophone
- Matt Zebley - saxophone
- Robbie Hioki - trombone
- George McMullen - trombone
- Scot Ray - trombone
- Craig Woods - trombone
- Will Murillo - trumpet
- Kevin Norton - trumpet
- Kye Palmer - trumpet
- Kevin Richardson - trumpet

Additional Musicians

- Eric Morones - saxophone
- Ernie Perez - 'Talkin Trash' on "Gettin' In the Mood"
- 14 Karat Soul, Maxi Anderson, Bobbi Page, Andrea Robinson, Julia Waters, Maxine Waters, Carmen Twillie, Siedah Garrett, Mike Himelstein, Dave Bassett - background vocals

Production

- Peter Collins - producer on all tracks except "Getting In the Mood"
- John Holbrook - engineering and mixing on all tracks except "Pennsylvania 6-5000", "Americano" and "Getting In the Mood"
- Michael Parnell and Justin Walden - additional engineering
- David Nottingham, Mike Zainer, Darrell Thorp and Tony Rambo - assistant engineers
- Glen Ballard - producer on "Getting In the Mood"
- David Darling - producer on "Pennsylvania 6-5000", associate producer on "Getting In the Mood", mixing on "Pennsylvania 6-5000" and "Americano"
- Jeff Peters - mixing on "Pennsylvania 6-5000" and "Americano"
- Al Schmitt - engineering on "Getting In the Mood"
- Chris Lord-Alge - mixing on "Getting In the Mood"
- Bob Ludwig - mastering
- Mark Jones, Ray Herrmann - orchestration

== Charts ==
Chart (2000)	Peak position
Canada Top Albums/CDs (RPM)	45
Dutch Albums (Album Top 100)	83
German Albums (Offizielle Top 100)	33
US Billboard 200	62
