= (She's) Sexy + 17 =

Single by Stray Cats

from the album Rant n' Rave with the Stray Cats
- B-side: "Looking Better Every Beer"
- Released: July 1983
- Recorded: 1983
- Genre: Rockabilly
- Length: 3:13 (Single Version); 3:28 (Album Version)
- Label: EMI America
- Songwriter: Brian Setzer
- Producer: Dave Edmunds

Stray Cats singles chronology
"Little Miss Prissy" (1981)	"(She's) Sexy + 17" (1983)	"I Won't Stand in Your Way" (1983)

"(She's) Sexy + 17" is a 1983 song by the Stray Cats, released by EMI America in July 1983 as the lead single from the album Rant N' Rave with the Stray Cats. The song became their 3rd and last top 10 hit, reaching No. 5 on the Billboard Hot 100 singles chart. It also reached No. 2 on the Billboard Top Rock Tracks chart for one week, and No. 29 in the UK Singles Chart.

Cash Box called the song "an exciting new single" with "a shakin' rockabilly production."

== Charts ==
=== Weekly charts ===
Chart (1983)	Peak position
Belgium (Ultratop 50 Flanders)	10
Canada (RPM Top 100)	4
Netherlands (Dutch Top 40)	9
Netherlands (Single Top 100)	22
New Zealand (Recorded Music NZ)	41
UK Singles (Official Charts)	29
US Billboard Hot 100	5
US Mainstream Rock (Billboard)	2

=== Year-end charts ===
Chart (1983)	Position
Canada (RPM)	31
Netherlands (Dutch Top 40)	77
US Billboard Hot 100	84
