= Swing revival =

Music genre and pop culture movement

- Other names: Retro swing; neo-swing
- Stylistic origins: Swing; jazz; vocal jazz; jump blues; boogie-woogie; big band; rockabilly; lounge
- Cultural origins: 1980s–1990s, United States

Subgenres
- Swing punk

Other topics
- Punk jazz; third wave ska; psychobilly

The swing revival, also called retro swing and neo-swing, was a renewed interest in swing music and Lindy Hop and swing dance, beginning in the early 1980s and reaching a peak in the late 1990s. The music was generally rooted in the big bands of the swing era of the 1930s and 1940s, but it was also greatly influenced by rockabilly, boogie-woogie, the jump blues of artists such as Louis Prima and Louis Jordan; and the theatrics of Cab Calloway. Many neo-swing bands practiced contemporary fusions of swing, jazz, and jump blues with rock, punk rock, ska, and ska punk music or had roots in punk, ska, ska punk, and alternative rock music.

== History ==
=== Earlier Canadian revival ===
In Canada, the term “swing revival” is associated with the popularity of new dance band recordings by Peter Appleyard's All Star Swing Band and Dal Richards in the early 1980s. The Spitfire Band, a neo-swing outfit that included composer and musician Jackie Rae, trumpeter Micky Erbe, and trombonist Laurie Bower, was founded in 1981 and issued a series of LPs for Columbia Records.

=== Revival in the United States ===
The roots of the swing revival in the United States are generally traced back to 1989, which saw the formation of several of the scene's most prominent figures: Los Angeles' Royal Crown Revue and Big Bad Voodoo Daddy, who often stuck close to playing traditionally-styled jump blues and rockabilly; San Francisco's swing scene included Lee Presson and the Nails who started performing at local clubs in 1994 and Lavay Smith & Her Red Hot Skillet Lickers, who showcased vocal jazz and blues influences, emerging in 1996; and Eugene, Oregon's Cherry Poppin' Daddies, who incorporated elements of punk rock and ska into swing and jazz music.

California soon emerged as the center of the burgeoning neo-swing movement, with such clubs as Los Angeles' The Derby and San Francisco's Club DeLuxe regularly hosting swing and jazz bands as well as offering free swing dancing lessons. By the early 1990s, swing music had started appearing in popular culture, serving as the focal point of the 1993 drama Swing Kids while featuring heavily in the 1994 comedy The Mask, in which Royal Crown Revue made an on-screen cameo. By this time, retro swing had started expanding outside of its West Coast roots, leading to the formation of swing bands in such places as Texas (8½ Souvenirs, The Lucky Strikes), Michigan (The Atomic Fireballs, The Deluxtone Rockets), North Carolina (Squirrel Nut Zippers) and Canada (including Big Rude Jake in Toronto, Ontario and Johnny Favourite Swing Orchestra in Halifax, Nova Scotia).

In 1996, the American comedy Swingers, which featured scenes filmed at The Derby and a musical performance by Big Bad Voodoo Daddy, became a critical and commercial success and is frequently credited with bringing the swing revival further into the cultural mainstream.

In April 1997, the Squirrel Nut Zippers' 1996 single "Hell" appeared on the Billboard charts, effectively becoming the first hit song of the swing revival; their album Hot would achieve platinum sales of one million units by the RIAA by December 1997. In March 1997, the Cherry Poppin' Daddies released their swing compilation Zoot Suit Riot, attaining platinum status in August 1998 and double-platinum status in January 2000 while its titular single peaked at #41 on the Billboard Hot 100. The Brian Setzer Orchestra, which was founded by former Stray Cats frontman Brian Setzer in 1992, also achieved double-platinum sales with their 1998 album The Dirty Boogie, whose cover of Louis Prima's 1956 song "Jump, Jive an' Wail" became the highest-charting single of swing revival, peaking at #23 on the Billboard Hot 100 and winning a Grammy Award for Best Pop Performance by a Duo or Group with Vocal. At the same time in 1998, The Gap used Prima's version of "Jump, Jive an' Wail" in a "Khakis Swing" commercial; according to Stereogum, Gap's commercialization of the revival in particular was considered by some as signifying the end of the 90s swing revival or movement, though not before Big Bad Voodoo Daddy performed "Go Daddy-O" for a national audience during the Super Bowl XXXIII halftime show in January, 1999. Examples of neo-swing in general continue to be produced beyond the 90s.

== See also ==
- Lindy Hop
- Charleston
- Swing music
- Swing (dance)
- Electro swing
