= The Knife Feels Like Justice =

Studio album by Brian Setzer
- Released: 1986
- Studios: One On One (Los Angeles); Tiki Recording (Glen Cove, NY); Can Am (Tarzana, CA); Record Plant (New York); Rumbo (Los Angeles)
- Genre: Rock
- Label: EMI America
- Producer: Don Gehman

Brian Setzer chronology
The Knife Feels Like Justice (1986)	Live Nude Guitars (1988)

The Knife Feels Like Justice is the debut album by American musician Brian Setzer, released in 1986 on the EMI America record label.

In contrast to the rockabilly sound of his earlier band Stray Cats, this album emphasizes a roots rock sound, in the style of one of his major influences, John Cougar Mellencamp. Setzer utilized Mellencamp's producer, Don Gehman, and his drummer, Kenny Aronoff, for the studio recordings.

The album peaked at number 45 on the US Billboard album chart in April 1986. A music video for the title track was shot on Pueblo land near Taos, New Mexico. The video features all the musicians from the studio recording except drummer Aronoff, whose onscreen substitute was the E Street Band's Max Weinberg.

It was re-released on CD in 1990 and again in 1999. In 2007 it was released again as part of a "2 albums on 1 CD" format, paired with his 1988 follow-up album Live Nude Guitars. An import CD version is also available.

== Track listing ==
All tracks composed by Brian Setzer except where indicated:

1. "The Knife Feels Like Justice"
2. "Haunted River"
3. "Boulevard of Broken Dreams"
4. "Bobby's Back"
5. "Radiation Ranch"
6. "Chains Around Your Heart"
7. "Maria" (Setzer, Steven Van Zandt)
8. "Three Guys"
9. "Aztec" (Setzer, Mike Campbell)
10. "Breath of Life" (Setzer, Tommy Byrnes)
11. "Barbwire Fence"

== Personnel ==
- Brian Setzer - guitar, lead vocals
- Tommy Byrnes - guitar, backing vocals
- Chuck Leavell - keyboards
- Kenny Aaronson - bass
- Kenny Aronoff - drums, percussion
- Steve Jordan - drums (track 4)
- Benmont Tench - organ (track 4)
- Mike Campbell - 12-string guitar (track 9)
- Peggi Blu - vocals (tracks 3, 8, 10)
- Queen Esther Marrow - vocals (tracks 3, 8, 10)
- Diva Grey - vocals (tracks 3, 8, and 10)
- Dave Williams - vocals (tracks 2, 4, 6)
- Andrew Williams - vocals (tracks 2, 4, 6)
- Yvonne Zuaro - vocals (tracks 1, 7, 9, 11)

Technical

- John Aiosa - pre-production producer
- Howard Rosenberg - cover photography

== Critical reception ==
Professional ratings
Review scores
Source	Rating
AllMusic	4/5 stars

In a retrospective review, critic Mark Deming pondered how the album is "a rare example of Setzer taking a stab at contemporary rock & roll with a message, and it is more successful than anyone might have expected," emphasizing that "there's a heart and sincerity to this material that's genuine and affecting."

== Charts ==
Chart (1986)	Peak position
Canada Top Albums/CDs (RPM)	69
Swedish Albums (Sverigetopplistan)	29
US Billboard 200	45
