= The Brian Setzer Orchestra =

American band

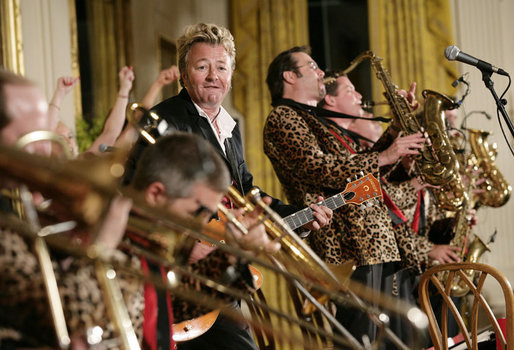
- The Brian Setzer Orchestra performing in the East Room of the White House in 2006

Background information
- Also known as: BSO
- Origin: United States
- Genres: Swing revival; jump blues; rockabilly; rock and roll
- Years active: 1990–present
- Labels: Interscope, Hollywood, Surfdog
- Website: www.briansetzer.com

The Brian Setzer Orchestra (sometimes known by its initials BSO) is a swing and jump blues band formed in 1992 by Stray Cats frontman Brian Setzer. In 1998, for their breakout album The Dirty Boogie, the group covered Louis Prima's "Jump, Jive an' Wail", which originally appeared on Prima's 1957 album The Wildest!. The BSO's follow up single, appearing on the album Vavoom!, was "Gettin' in the Mood."

== History ==
Setzer grew up on Long Island, New York. In his youth, he played the euphonium and other brass instruments in school jazz bands. In the 1970s, he found ways to hear jazz and big band music at the Village Vanguard, but he was also drawn to blues, rock, punk, and rockabilly. He admired the jump blues of Louis Prima and Big Joe Turner, but also the rock and roll of Elvis Presley, Eddie Cochran, Gene Vincent, and Carl Perkins.

During the early 1980s, he led the rockabilly trio the Stray Cats and found popular and commercial success. After the band broke up, Setzer worked as a side man and on a solo career. In 1994, he released the debut album of the Brian Setzer Orchestra, which combined his rockabilly style with swing, big band, and jump blues. The orchestra had a hit on the Billboard singles chart with its cover version of "Jump, Jive an' Wail" by Louis Prima.

== Activities ==
The BSO often plays during the December holidays covering Christmas songs, and plays the Rockefeller Center tree-lighting ceremony. Setzer tunes have been used in commercials.

The Brian Setzer Orchestra performed 36 concerts on their "Christmas Rocks! 2017" tour which ran from November to December 2017.

== Discography ==
- The Brian Setzer Orchestra (1994)
- Guitar Slinger (1996)
- The Dirty Boogie (1998)
- Vavoom! (2000)
- Boogie Woogie Christmas (2002)
- Dig That Crazy Christmas (2005)
- Wolfgang's Big Night Out (2007)
- Songs from Lonely Avenue (2009)
- Rockin' Rudolph (2015)

=== Compilations and live albums ===
- Jumpin' East of Java (2001)
- Best of The Big Band (2002)
- Jump, Jive an' Wail: The Best of the Brian Setzer Orchestra 1994-2000 (2003)
- The Ultimate Collection (2004)
- The Best of Collection – Christmas Rocks! (2008)
- Ultimate Christmas Collection (2008)
- Don't Mess With a Big Band (Live!) (2010)
- Christmas Comes Alive! (2010)
- It's Gonna Rock 'Cause That's What I Do (2010)

=== DVDs ===
- Brian Setzer Orchestra live In Japan (2001)
- Brian Setzer Orchestra Live: Christmas Extravaganza (2005)
- One Rockin' Night (2007) – recorded in Montreal in 1995
- Brian Setzer Orchestra Live: Christmas Rocks! (2018)
