= George Motola =

American record producer

George Louis Motola (November 15, 1919 – February 15, 1991) was an American record producer, songwriter and sound engineer from the 1950s until his death.

== Early life and career ==
Motola, whose last name is often misspelled as Mottola, was born in Hartford, Connecticut, one of five brothers and three sisters born to parents who had migrated to the USA from Italy. He started his business career as a used car dealer, but soon found out that music was his real interest. He met his first wife, Francis Holgate at a diner during this time when she was working and they married in 1940. He shares 3 children with her, Brenda, Lynn and Lisa. Francis and George divorced in 1958. By the mid-1950s he was working as a producer at Modern Records in Los Angeles, where he supervised acts like Jesse Belvin, Young Jessie and Jimmy Beasley.

His most famous composition is "Goodnight My Love", which was originally recorded by Jesse Belvin in 1956 (# 7 R&B). Subsequent versions by the McGuire Sisters (1957), Ray Peterson (1959), The Fleetwoods (1963), Ben E. King (1966), Paul Anka (1969), The Four Seasons (1963), and Paula Abdul (1991), all made the Billboard Top 100. Paul Anka reached no. 27 on Billboard in 1969 with his recording. The song was written by George Motola with John Marascalco.

Motola was instrumental in the creation of The Shields, a group he formed with the sole purpose of covering "You Cheated" by The Slades for his own Tender label. The group included Frankie Ervin (lead singer), Jesse Belvin and Johnny "Guitar" Watson. Sold to Randy Wood's Dot Records label, "You Cheated" became a # 12 pop hit; the B-side, "That's the Way It's Gonna Be", was co-written by Motola.

In 1960, Motola produced one of the wildest rock 'n' roll recordings ever made, "Rockin' This Joint Tonight" by Kid Thomas (real name Tommy Louis). Motola himself was too busy to do anything with the record, but he pointed the Kid in the direction of one Brat Atwood, who promptly took one-half writer's credit and issued it on his TRC label. Just as Thomas was set to do television appearances and start promoting the record, Atwood got into some unspecified problems and the label folded.

Motola was a prolific songwriter, with 120 entries in the BMI database. Among his compositions is "Shattered Dreams", recorded by the Johnny Burnette Trio, and he co-wrote "Here Comes Henry" for Young Jessie (with Jerry Leiber and Mike Stoller), both sides of the Ernie Fields 1958 single "Annie's Rock"/"Strollin' After School"(Jamie 1102) and "Lou Be Doo" for Sanford Clark.

== Co-writing ==
He started off writing with his brother, Joe Motola.

Most of his co-writing was with his 2nd wife, Rickie Page, their best-known composition being "Jeannie, Jeannie, Jeannie" (Eddie Cochran and others). Page was a recording star in her own right, with releases on Liberty, Dot, Zephyr and Rendezvous. Her 1957 recording of "Wee Willie" (Liberty 55094, co-written by Motola and Hal Winn) was included on the CD Liberty Rock & Roll; Eddie Cochran may be playing guitar on this track, according to Tapio. The vocal group The Georgettes, which included Page, was named after George Motola. Their record "Love Like A Fool"/ "Oh Tonight" (Ebb 125, both sides Motola-Page compositions) was released in the UK on London HL 8548. Page was also involved in several other groups (sometimes with other female members of her musical family): The Bermudas (who recorded for Era), Joanne & the Triangles, The Majorettes and Beverly and the Motorscooters. Motola and Page also ran Troy Records, the original 1964 outlet for "He's My Boyfriend" by Becky and the Lollipops, yet another name used by the Page clan.

== Death ==
George Motola died in 1991, survived by his ex wives and his 8 children. From a chartered boat filled with friends, business associates and family, the ashes of Motola were scattered at sea, and his greatest hit was sung, a cappella, by Barbara Ellis of The Fleetwoods (for whom "Goodnight My Love" had been their 11th Billboard Hit).
