= Jump, Jive an' Wail =

1956 song by Louis Prima

Song by Louis Prima

from the album The Wildest!
- Released: October 1956
- Recorded: April 1956
- Genre: Swing; jump blues
- Length: 3:28
- Label: Capitol
- Producer: Voyle Gilmore

"Jump, Jive an' Wail" is a 1956 jazz swing song by Louis Prima. It first appeared on his album The Wildest! and became one of his signature songs.

== Background ==
Keely Smith, Prima's wife at that time, was one of the backup singers on the song. The song had a resurgence in popularity during the swing revival in the late 1990s.

== Cover versions ==
"Jump Jive An' Wail"

Single by The Brian Setzer Orchestra

from the album The Dirty Boogie
- Released: August 1998
- Genre: Swing; jump blues; rockabilly; rock and roll
- Length: 2:53
- Label: Interscope
- Producer: Peter Collins

The Brian Setzer Orchestra covered the song on their 1998 album The Dirty Boogie. In 1999, Setzer's cover won the Grammy Award for Best Pop Performance by a Duo or Group with Vocals at the 41st Grammy Awards. Big Bad Voodoo Daddy covered the song on their 2017 album Louie, Louie, Louie album—a tribute to Louis Prima, Louis Jordan, and Louis Armstrong.

== Popular culture ==
- The 1998 version was featured in Stuart Little, and The Swing Big Band version was featured in Jonah: A VeggieTales Movie trailers.
- The 1998 version was seen as an archive footage clip was featured during the music "Dickie's Dream" by Count Basie in the final episode, "A Masterpiece by Midnight" from the 2001 Ken Burns documentary Jazz.
- The Gap used Prima's version in a "Khakis Swing" commercial in 1998.
- Louis Prima's version is used in the 2008 MGM animated film Igor.
