= Rock This Town =

Single by Stray Cats

from the album Stray Cats/Built for Speed
- B-side: "You Can't Hurry Love"
- Released: January 30, 1981 (UK); August 31, 1982 (US)
- Recorded: 1981
- Genre: Rockabilly; rock and roll; new wave
- Length: 2:39 (Single Version); 3:28 (Album Version)
- Label: Arista (UK); EMI America (U.S.)
- Songwriter: Brian Setzer
- Producer: Dave Edmunds

Stray Cats singles chronology
| "Runaway Boys" (1980) | "Rock This Town" (1981) | "Stray Cat Strut" (1981) |

Alternative covers
- US 7" single cover

"Rock This Town" is the second single by American rockabilly band Stray Cats, released January 30, 1981 by Arista Records in the U.K., where it peaked at No. 9 on the Singles Chart. It was taken from the band's 1981 debut album, Stray Cats.

Its first US release, by EMI America, was on the June 1982 album Built for Speed. Released as a single on August 31, 1982, it debuted on the Billboard Hot 100 for the week of September 18, 1982, and peaked at No. 9.

"Rock This Town" was listed by the Rock and Roll Hall of Fame as one of the "500 Songs that Shaped Rock and Roll".

The song has been featured in a variety of media including the video games Guitar Hero II, Donkey Konga, and Elite Beat Agents, as well as the video game based on the 2006 Pixar film Cars.

== Charts ==
=== Weekly charts ===
| Chart (1981–1982) | Peak position |
|---|---|
| Australia (Kent Music Report) | 38 |
| Belgium (Ultratop 50 Flanders) | 3 |
| Canada Top Singles (RPM) | 6 |
| Ireland (IRMA) | 6 |
| Netherlands (Dutch Top 40) | 3 |
| Netherlands (Single Top 100) | 3 |
| New Zealand (Recorded Music NZ) | 18 |
| Norway (VG-lista) | 10 |
| UK Singles (OCC) | 9 |
| US Billboard Hot 100 | 9 |
| US Mainstream Rock (Billboard) | 4 |

=== Year-end charts ===
| Chart (1981) | Position |
|---|---|
| Belgium (Ultratop Flanders) | 35 |
| Canada (Top 100) 1982 | 65 |
| Canada (Top 100) 1983 | 61 |
| Netherlands (Dutch Top 40) | 56 |
| Netherlands (Single Top 100) | 41 |
