= Brian Setzer =

American singer, songwriter (b. 1959)

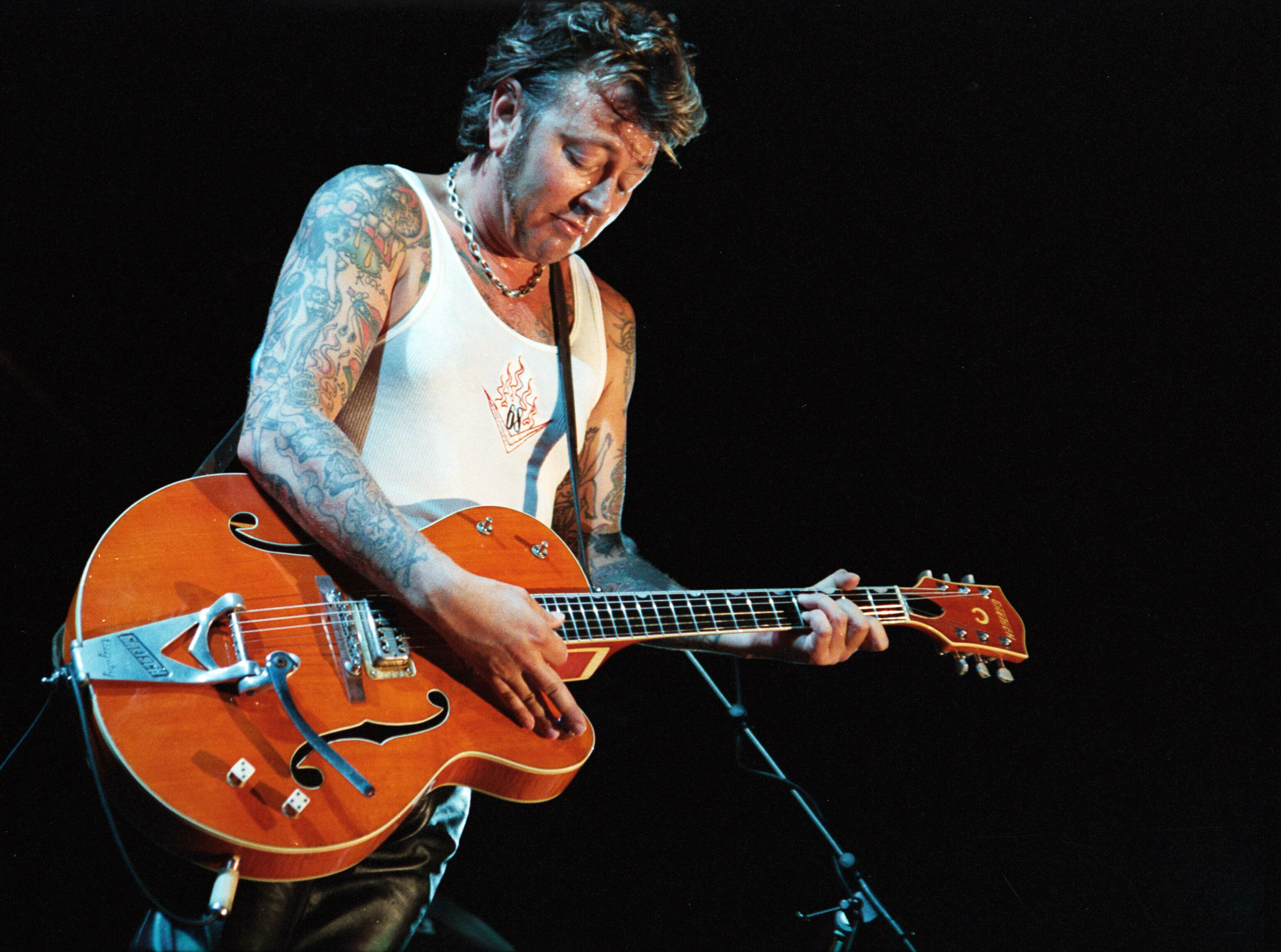
- Setzer in 2006

Background information
- Born: Brian Robert Setzer; April 10, 1959 (age 67); Massapequa, New York, U.S.
- Genres: Rockabilly; rock and roll; punk rock; new wave; swing revival; jump blues
- Occupations: Musician; songwriter; record producer
- Instruments: Guitar; vocals
- Years active: 1979–present
- Labels: Arista; EMI; Interscope; Surfdog
- Member of: Stray Cats
- Formerly of: The Bloodless Pharaohs
- Website: briansetzer.com

Signature
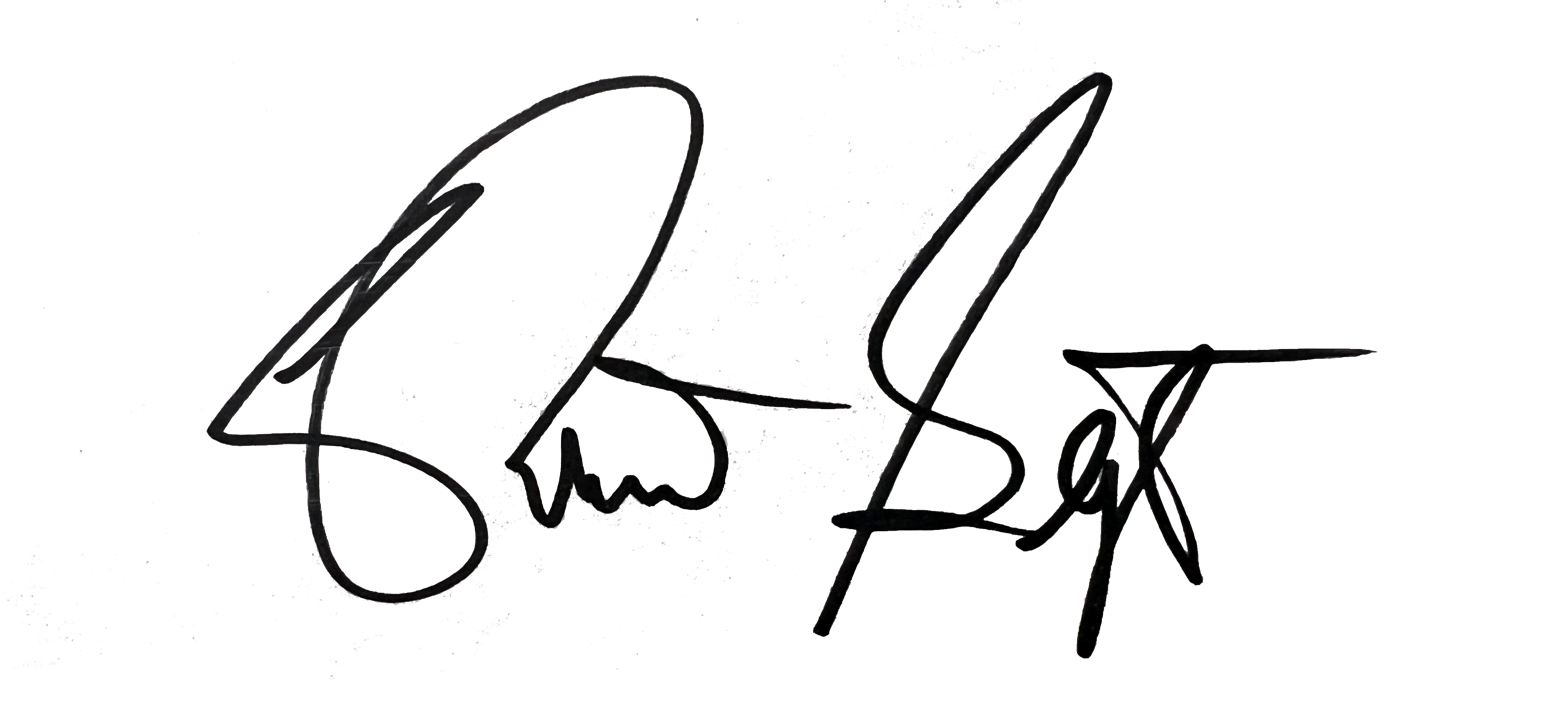

Brian Robert Setzer (born April 10, 1959) is an American guitarist, singer, and songwriter. He found widespread success in the early 1980s with the 1950s-style rockabilly group Stray Cats, and returned to the music scene in the early 1990s with his swing revival band, the Brian Setzer Orchestra. In 1987, he played the role of Eddie Cochran in the film La Bamba.

== Career ==
=== Stray Cats ===
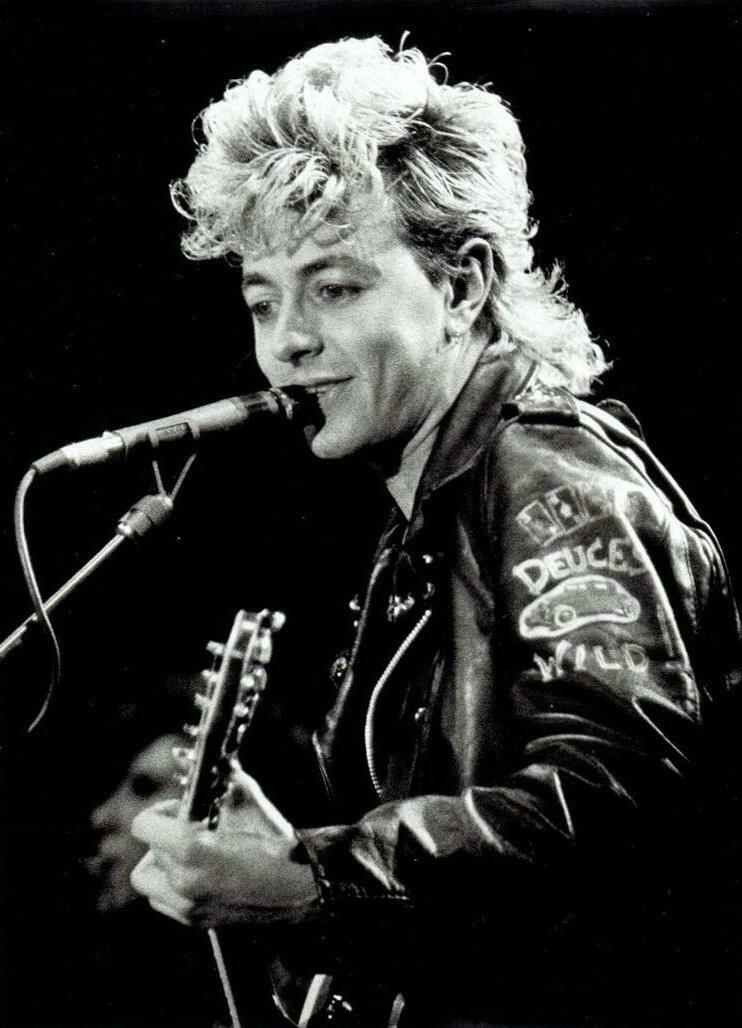
Setzer performing with the Stray Cats in Tampa, Florida, 1983

Setzer was born April 1959 in Massapequa, New York. He started on the euphonium and played in jazz bands when he was in school. He found a way to hear jazz at the Village Vanguard, though as he got older he became more interested in rock, punk, and rockabilly. He was a member of the Bloodless Pharaohs and the Tomcats, which he began with his brother, Gary. The Tomcats became the Stray Cats when double bassist Lee Rocker and drummer Slim Jim Phantom joined and Gary left the band. In 1980, thinking they might have more success in England than in America, they sold their instruments to pay for airplane tickets and flew to London.

After performing in London for a few months, they met Dave Edmunds, a guitarist and record producer who shared their love of rockabilly and 1950s' rock and roll. Edmunds produced their debut album, Stray Cats (Arista, 1981), which yielded two hit singles: "Stray Cat Strut" and "Rock This Town". The second album, Gonna Ball (Arista, 1982), was less successful. The band returned to America and released Built for Speed (EMI, 1982), produced again by Dave Edmunds, with songs collected from their first two albums. Helped by their music videos on MTV, the Stray Cats became popular in America. Their next album, Rant n' Rave with the Stray Cats (EMI, 1983) produced the hit "(She's) Sexy + 17".

The Stray Cats disbanded in 1984, though they occasionally reunited, recorded, and toured. After recording three albums with different producers, they returned to Dave Edmunds for Choo Choo Hot Fish (1992).

=== Solo career/The Brian Setzer Orchestra ===
After the Stray Cats disbanded in 1984, Setzer began a solo career that included working as a sideman for other acts, such as the Honeydrippers led by Robert Plant. On his first solo album, The Knife Feels Like Justice (EMI, 1986), he turned away from rockabilly and moved toward rhythm and blues (R&B) and the heartland rock of John Mellencamp. The album was produced by Don Gehman and featured Kenny Aronoff on drums. Both men had worked on albums by Mellencamp. His second studio album Live Nude Guitars followed in 1988. While this album retained some heartland rock elements, it found Setzer moving in more of a straight-ahead blues rock direction, comparable to George Thorogood's style; Setzer served as co-producer along with Larson Paine, Chris Thomas and David A. Stewart. He went on tour with Thorogood later that year.

Setzer returned to his love of music from the 1950s, this time the jump blues of Louis Prima. Whereas he had resurrected rockabilly in the 1980s, he resuscitated swing in the 1990s. He assembled the Brian Setzer Orchestra, a seventeen-piece big band that got the public's attention with a cover version of Prima's "Jump, Jive an' Wail" from the album The Dirty Boogie (Interscope, 1998). The song won the Grammy Award for Best Pop Performance by a Duo or Group with Vocals, while "Sleep Walk" from the same album won the Grammy for Best Pop Instrumental Performance.

The album Wolfgang's Big Night Out (2007) featured Setzer's interpretation of classical pieces, such as Beethoven's "Symphony No. 5" and "Für Elise". Wolfgang earned Setzer his eighth Grammy nomination, this time for Best Classical Crossover Album.

Setzer executive produced the album Ready Steady Go! (Surfdog, 2014) by Drake Bell and played guitar on two songs.

On June 25, 2021, Setzer announced a new solo album, his first in 7 years, titled Gotta Have the Rumble.

== Personal life ==
Setzer has been married three times, first to DeAnna Madsen with whom he has one son, second to Christine Schmidt with whom he has two children, and most recently in 2005 to Julie Reiten, a former singer with The Dust Bunnies. He lives in Minneapolis.

In February 2025, Setzer shared that he had an autoimmune disease which prevented him from playing guitar. In November 2025, Setzer announced he was battling a "serious illness" which required cancellation of a cross-country tour of the United States. In March 2026, Setzer announced that he had recovered and Stray Cats would resume touring.

== Awards and honors ==
- Orville H. Gibson Lifetime Achievement Award, 1999
- Grammy Award for Best Pop Performance by a Duo or Group with Vocals, "Jump, Jive an' Wail", 1998
- Grammy Award for Best Pop Instrumental Performance, "Sleep Walk" and "Caravan"
- Long Island Music Hall of Fame, 2015

== Discography ==
=== Solo ===
- The Knife Feels Like Justice (EMI, 1986)
- Live Nude Guitars (EMI, 1988)
- Rockin' by Myself (InsideOut [Japan], 1993)
- Ignition! (Surfdog, 2001)
- Nitro Burnin' Funny Daddy (Surfdog, 2003)
- Rockabilly Riot Vol. 1: A Tribute to Sun Records (Surfdog, 2005)
- 13 (Surfdog, 2006)
- Red Hot & Live (Surfdog, 2007)
- Setzer Goes Instru-Mental! (Surfdog, 2011)
- Rockabilly Riot! Live from the Planet (Surfdog, 2012)
- Rockabilly Riot! All Original (Surfdog, 2014)
- Gotta Have the Rumble (Surfdog, 2021)
- The Devil Always Collects (Surfdog, 2023)

The Brian Setzer Orchestra

- The Brian Setzer Orchestra (Hollywood, 1994)
- Guitar Slinger (Interscope, 1996)
- The Dirty Boogie (Interscope, 1998)
- Vavoom! (Interscope, 2000)
- Jumpin' East of Java (Toy's Factory, 2001)
- Boogie Woogie Christmas (Surfdog, 2002)
- Dig That Crazy Christmas (Surfdog, 2005)
- Wolfgang's Big Night Out (Surfdog, 2007)
- Songs from Lonely Avenue (Surfdog, 2009)
- Christmas Comes Alive (Surfdog, 2010)
- Rockin' Rudolph (Surfdog, 2015)

=== As member ===
Bloodless Pharaohs

- Marty Thau Presents 12 x 5 (Red Star, 1980) on two tracks
- Brian Setzer and the Bloodless Pharaohs (Collectables, 1996)

Stray Cats

- Stray Cats (1981)
- Gonna Ball (1981)
- Built for Speed (1982)
- Rant n' Rave with the Stray Cats (1983)
- Rock Therapy (1986)
- Blast Off! (1989)
- Let's Go Faster! (1990)
- The Best of the Stray Cats: Rock This Town (1990)
- Choo Choo Hot Fish (1992)
- Original Cool (1993)
- Rumble in Brixton (2004)
- 40 (2019)

=== As guest ===
- Be Chrool To Your School, Twisted Sister (1985)
- Deep in the Heart of Nowhere, Bob Geldof (1986)
- Sentimental Hygiene, Warren Zevon (1987)
- Closer to the Flame, Dave Edmunds (1989)
- Two Fires, Jimmy Barnes (1990)
- Traffic from Paradise, Rickie Lee Jones (1993)
- Muddy Water Blues: A Tribute to Muddy Waters, Paul Rodgers (1993)
- La Bamba, Los Lobos (1993)
- Toolin' Around, Arlen Roth (1993)
- Bug Alley, Gary Hoey (1996)
- Cheating at Solitaire, Mike Ness (1999)
- Beatin' the Heat, Dan Hicks (2000)
- Ghost on the Canvas, Glen Campbell (2011)
- Step Back, Johnny Winter (2014)
- Ready Steady Go!, Drake Bell (2014)
- "Uptown Number 7", Dion from Blues with Friends (2020)

== DVDs ==
- Brian Setzer Orchestra Live in Japan (2001)
- Rumble in Brixton (2004)
- Brian Setzer Orchestra Live: Christmas Extravaganza (2005)
- One Rockin' Night ('95) (2007)
- Live in Montreal Jazz Festival (2010)
- Rockabilly Riot! Osaka Rocka Live in Japan (2016)
- Brian Setzer Orchestra Live: Christmas Rocks! (2018)

== Musical equipment ==
Brian Setzer has a large guitar collection which spans many decades and brands. He favours vintage equipment and hollow body guitars, and currently endorses Gretsch guitars.

Vintage guitars:

- D'Angelico Excel - 1938
- D'Angelico New Yorker - 1940
- Martin Model D-28 Acoustic - 1956
- Fender Stratocaster Turquoise - 1957
- Guild Bluesbird - 1959
- Gretsch Model 6130 Round Up - 1955
- Gretsch Model 6128 Black Duo Jet - 1958
- Gretsch Model 6136 White Falcon - 1957
- Gretsch Model 6129 Silver Jet - No Pickguard - 1957
- Gretsch Model 6129 Silver Jet - White Pickguard - 1957
- Gretsch Model 6136 White Falcon - 1957
- Gretsch Model 6129 Silver Jet - Black Pickguard - 1958
- Gretsch Model 6120 "Stray Cat" - 1959
- Gretsch Model 6120 Chet Atkins - 1959
- Gretsch Model 6119 "Christmas Custom" - 1959
- Gretsch Model 6119 Blue Sparkle Jet - 1959
- Gretsch Model 6120 - 1960
- Gretsch Model 6119 - 1960
- Gibson Firebird V - 1964

Signature guitars:

- Gretsch Model 6120 Setzer Signature Prototype
- Gretsch Model 6120 Setzer Hot Rod Custom Purple
- Gretsch Model 6120 Setzer Hot Rod Custom "Pinstripe"
- Gretsch Model 6120 Setzer Hot Rod Custom "Spotty"
- Gretsch Model 6120 Setzer Hot Rod Custom "Sparkle Red"
- Gretsch Model 6120 Setzer Hot Rod Custom "Sparkle Blue"
- Gretsch Model 6120 SSLVO Brian Setzer Signature
- Gretsch Model 6120 SSL Brian Setzer Signature
- Gretsch Model 6120 SSU Brian Setzer Signature
- Gretsch Model 6120 SSUGR Brian Setzer Signature
- Gretsch Model 6136SLBP Brian Setzer Black Phoenix
- Indie Model With White GT Stripes

Other guitars:

- Bigsby Custom - 2003
