= Stray Cats =

American rockabilly band

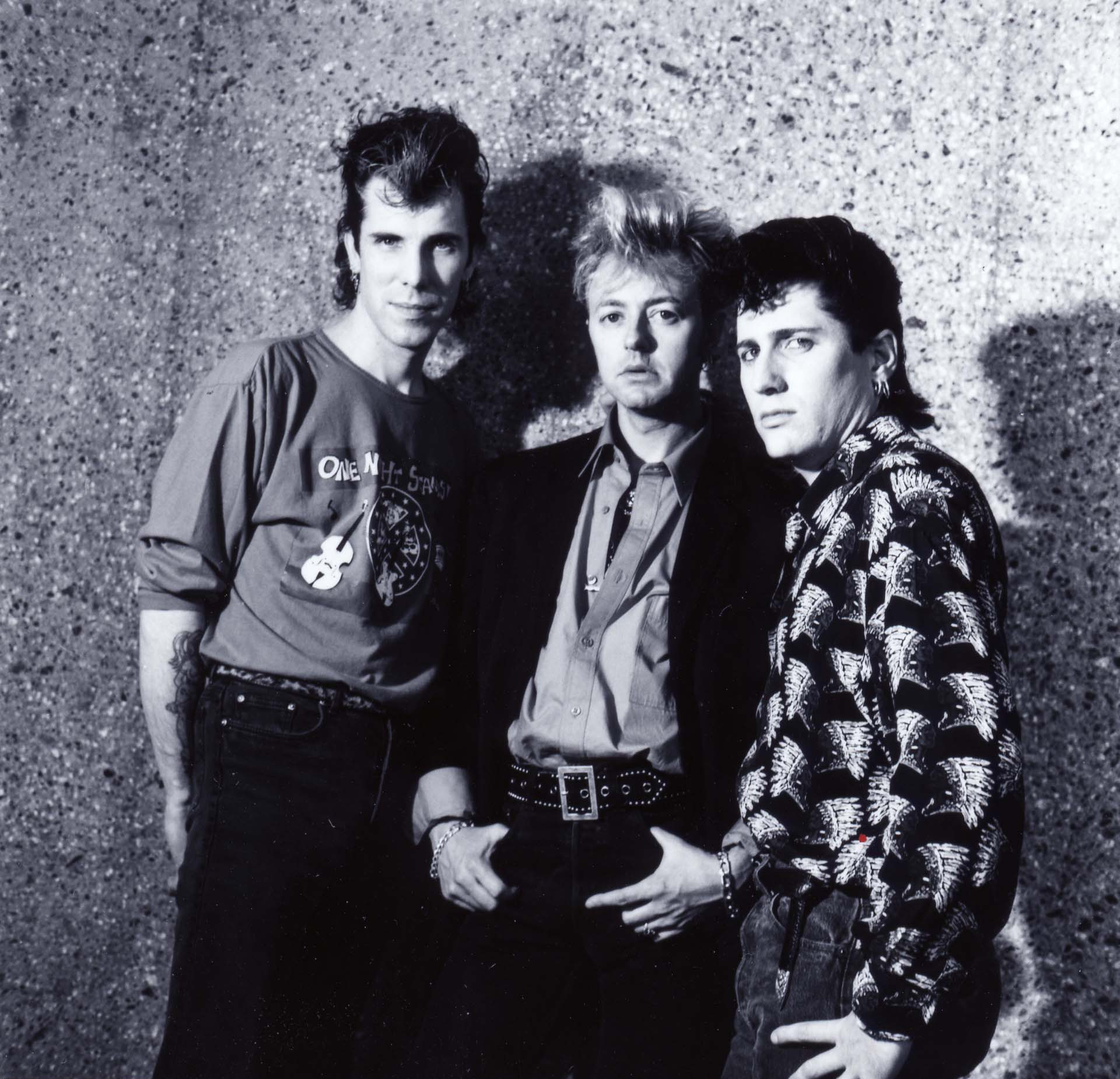
- Stray Cats in Japan, early 1990s L to R: Slim Jim Phantom, Brian Setzer, Lee Rocker

Background information
- Origin: Massapequa, New York, U.S.
- Genres: Rockabilly; new wave
- Years active: 1979–1984; 1986–1993; 2004–2009; 2018–present
- Labels: Arista; EMI America; Capitol; Surfdog
- Members: Brian Setzer; Lee Rocker; Slim Jim Phantom
- Past members: Bob Beecher; Gary Setzer; Tommy Byrnes
- Website: straycats.com

Stray Cats are an American rockabilly band formed in 1979 by guitarist and vocalist Brian Setzer, double bassist Lee Rocker, and drummer Slim Jim Phantom in the Long Island hamlet of Massapequa, New York. The group had numerous hit singles in the UK, Australia, Canada, and the U.S. including "Stray Cat Strut", "(She's) Sexy + 17", "Look at That Cadillac", "I Won't Stand in Your Way", "Bring It Back Again", and "Rock This Town", which the Rock and Roll Hall of Fame has listed as one of the songs that shaped rock and roll.

== History ==
=== Formation and move to UK ===
The band first appeared in the New York area in the middle of 1979 performing under a number of names including the Tomcats, the Teds, and Bryan and the Tom Cats. According to Brian Setzer (singer/songwriter and guitarist), they changed names to fool club owners (who would not hire the same band for consecutive nights), but kept the "Cats" moniker in their various names so the audience would know they were the same band.

Setzer joined up with Slim Jim Phantom (drums) and they soon added Phantom's schoolmate and friend Lee Rocker (stand-up bass); all three of them came from the same neighborhood in Massapequa and were interested in punk and rockabilly music.

Since 1983, they have used only "Stray Cats" as their name. The band name "Stray Cats" had appeared in the 1973 rock 'n' roll film That'll Be the Day and its 1974 sequel Stardust. They also went to many concerts and enjoyed the punk scene. They met the Clash and they used to see Siouxsie and the Banshees, Charlie Harper and the UK Subs.

The group, whose style was based upon the sounds of Sun Records artists and other artists from the 1950s, was heavily influenced by Eddie Cochran, Carl Perkins, Gene Vincent, and Bill Haley & His Comets. The Stray Cats quickly developed a large following in the New York music scene playing at CBGB and Max's Kansas City as well as venues on Long Island. When the Cats heard a rumor that there was a revival of the 1950s Teddy Boy youth subculture in England, the band moved to the UK. They spearheaded the nascent rockabilly revival, blending the 1950s Sun Studio sound with modern punk musical elements. In terms of visual style, the Stray Cats also blended elements of 1950 rockabilly clothes, such as wearing drape jackets, brothel creepers, and western shirts, with punk clothes, such as tight black zipper trousers and modern versions of 1950s hair styles.

In the middle of 1980, the band found themselves being courted by record labels including Virgin Records, Stiff Records, and Arista Records. Word quickly spread and soon members of The Rolling Stones, The Who, and Led Zeppelin were at their shows. After a gig in London, Stray Cats met musician and producer Dave Edmunds, well known as a roots rock enthusiast for his work with Rockpile and as a solo artist. Edmunds offered to work with the group, and they entered the studio to record their self-titled debut album, Stray Cats, released in Britain in 1981 on Arista Records. In addition to having three hits that year with "Runaway Boys", "Rock This Town", and "Stray Cat Strut", they also performed on the eighth day of the Montreux Jazz Festival. The UK follow-up to Stray Cats, Gonna Ball, was not as well-received, providing no hits. Yet the combined sales of their first two albums were enough to convince EMI America to compile the best tracks from the two UK albums and issue an album (Built for Speed) in the U.S. in 1982. The record went on to sell a million copies (Platinum) in the US and Canada and was the no. 2 record on the Billboard album charts for 15 weeks.

In 1983, the Stray Cats began recording their third (second U.S.) studio album Rant N' Rave with the Stray Cats. Unlike their previous studio albums, half the album was recorded in London with the rest recorded in New York. Released in August 1983, critics generally viewed Rant N' Rave favorably, citing the band's tributes to 1950s rock 'n' roll legends such as Gene Vincent and Bo Diddley. Commercially, Rant N' Rave failed to achieve the success of Built for Speed, although it produced the top-ten hit "(She's) Sexy + 17", and top-forty hit "I Won't Stand in Your Way" featuring the doo-wop group 14 Karat Soul.

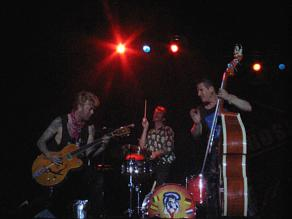
The band playing in Gijon

=== Breakup and reunions ===
Musical and personal conflicts began to emerge in the ways that the individual members handled their new-found success; Phantom married actress Britt Ekland, while Setzer made guest appearances with stars like Bob Dylan and Stevie Nicks and became the concert guitarist for Robert Plant's Honeydrippers side project. In late 1984, the band added former BMT's guitarist and Long Island native Tommy Byrnes on second guitar and harmony vocals. After a European and US tour which ended at the 1984 Louisiana World Exposition, Setzer made the decision to end the band, which left the other members aggrieved. In an interview, Setzer pleaded restlessness as his motivation: "It's just that I didn't get that great feeling anymore ... I had five good years of that, but then I got bored with it. In the last year I stopped getting that feeling, that great kick that twisted in my gut." Looking back in 2012, Setzer regretted the decision to dissolve the group saying "it was silly to break up the Stray Cats at the peak of our success".

Setzer embarked on a solo career, exchanging his rockabilly focus for a more wide-ranging roots rock/Americana sound on the 1986 album The Knife Feels Like Justice. He dubbed his new band Brian Setzer & the Radiation Ranch, drawing the name from the title of one of his new songs. They played their first major concert at the 1985 Farm Aid benefit festival.

Rocker and Phantom formed a trio called Phantom, Rocker & Slick (the "Slick" being former David Bowie guitarist Earl Slick) whose debut album contained the single "Men Without Shame"; guest musicians on this record included Keith Richards of The Rolling Stones and pianist Nicky Hopkins.

In 1986, the Stray Cats reunited in Los Angeles and recorded the covers-heavy Rock Therapy. A lengthy hiatus followed, but in 1989 they reunited once again for the album Blast Off!, which was accompanied by a tour with blues guitarist Stevie Ray Vaughan. No longer with EMI America, they entered the studio with Nile Rodgers for another album, Let's Go Faster, issued by Liberation in 1990. After 1992's Dave Edmunds-produced Choo Choo Hot Fish, and the cover album Original Cool, the group called it quits again.

In 2004, the Stray Cats reassembled for a month-long tour of Europe. A live album culled from those concerts, Rumble in Brixton, included one new studio track, "Mystery Train Kept A Rollin'". In 2007, they reunited once again for a US tour with ZZ Top and the Pretenders. This was their first North American tour in over 15 years. In the 2000s, the band toured Europe as part of their Farewell Tour.

In 2008, for the first time in 18 years, the Stray Cats visited Australia and New Zealand which included several consecutive sold-out shows of their Farewell (Australia) Tour. In April 2009 the band reunited for a single show to celebrate Brian's 50th birthday at the Fine Line Music Café in Minneapolis, Minnesota.

On January 2, 2018, Setzer announced via his Facebook page that the band would reunite for a show in Las Vegas on April 21, 2018. The Stray Cats also performed two shows at the Pacific Amphitheatre in Costa Mesa, California on August 16 and 17, 2018.

On October 16, 2018, the band announced they would reunite in 2019 for a new album (first in 25 years), record in Nashville, and tour to commemorate their 40th anniversary. On March 26, 2019, the video for the album's first single, "Cat Fight (Over a Dog Like Me)", was released, with an announcement of a May 24 release for the album, titled 40. This was released in time for the European legs of their 40th Anniversary tour.

At the conclusion of the tour and in early 2020 the band announced that an album, a collection of songs recorded at various locations while on the 40th Anniversary tour would be released, entitled "Rocked This Town: From LA to London". It was released on CD and Vinyl and also on a number of streaming platforms.

In 2024, the band completed a three-week summer U.S. tour, their first tour in five years.

In 2025, the Stray Cats announced a three-week fall 2025 U.S. tour and released two new recordings, an original song, "Stampede," co-written by Setzer, and a cover of Eddie Cochran's "Teenage Heaven." However, the tour was later canceled, citing Setzer battling "serious illness." In March 2026, the band announced a three-week summer 2026 U.S. tour, including several dates at venues that the band intended to perform at in 2025 before the tour cancellation.

=== Band members' follow-up careers ===
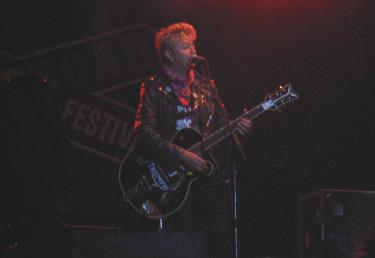
Brian Setzer at a concert

The Stray Cats have reunited periodically for live performances. Setzer is still part of his 1990s swing-revival band The Brian Setzer Orchestra. Setzer also worked as executive producer on Drake Bell's rockabilly revival album Ready Steady Go! Rocker continued recording and touring throughout the 1990s and on to today. His albums include Black Cat Bone and Racin' the Devil on Alligator Records, as well as Bulletproof.

In addition to the Stray Cats, Rocker has recorded or performed with Carl Perkins, George Harrison, Ringo Starr, Willie Nelson, Leon Russell, Scotty Moore, Keith Richards, and numerous others. Rocker and wife Deborah Drucker have two children and have been married since 1989. Slim Jim Phantom plays the drums in the bands Slim Jim's Phantom Trio, The Jack Tars, 13 Cats, Kat Men, and The Head Cat. He is also an active member of the Love Hope Strength Foundation, a charitable organization which was co-founded by Mike Peters of The Alarm, and which raises funds for cancer units.

The band was inducted into the Long Island Music Hall of Fame on October 15, 2006.

== Members ==
Current members

- Brian Setzer – lead vocals, guitar (1979–1984, 1986–1993, 2004–2009, 2018–present)
- Lee Rocker – double bass, bass guitar, vocals, occasional acoustic guitar (1979–1984, 1986–1993, 2004–2009, 2018–present)
- Slim Jim Phantom – drums, percussion, vocals (1979–1984, 1986–1993, 2004–2009, 2018–present)

Past members

- Bob Beecher – double bass (1979)
- Gary Setzer – drums (1979)
- Tommy Byrnes – harmony vocals, guitar (1984)

== Discography ==
- Stray Cats (1981)
- Gonna Ball (1981)
- Rant n' Rave with the Stray Cats (1983)
- Rock Therapy (1986)
- Blast Off! (1989)
- Let's Go Faster! (1990)
- Choo Choo Hot Fish (1992)
- Original Cool (1993)
- 40 (2019)

== Tours ==
- European Tour (1980)
- Stray Cats Tour (1981)
- Gonna Ball Tour (1982)
- Built for Speed Tour (1982–1983)
- Rant n' Rave Tour (1983–1984)
- Blast Off US-Tour (1988)
- Blast Off Tour (1989)
- Let's Go Faster Tour (1990)
- Murphy Tour (1991)
- Choo Choo Hot Fish Tour (1992)
- European Tour (2004)
- North American Tour (2007)
- Farewell Tour (2008–2009)
- 40th Anniversary Tour (2019)
- Summer Tour '24 (2024)
- Summer Tour '26 (2026)
