= Lee Rocker =

American double bass player (born 1961)

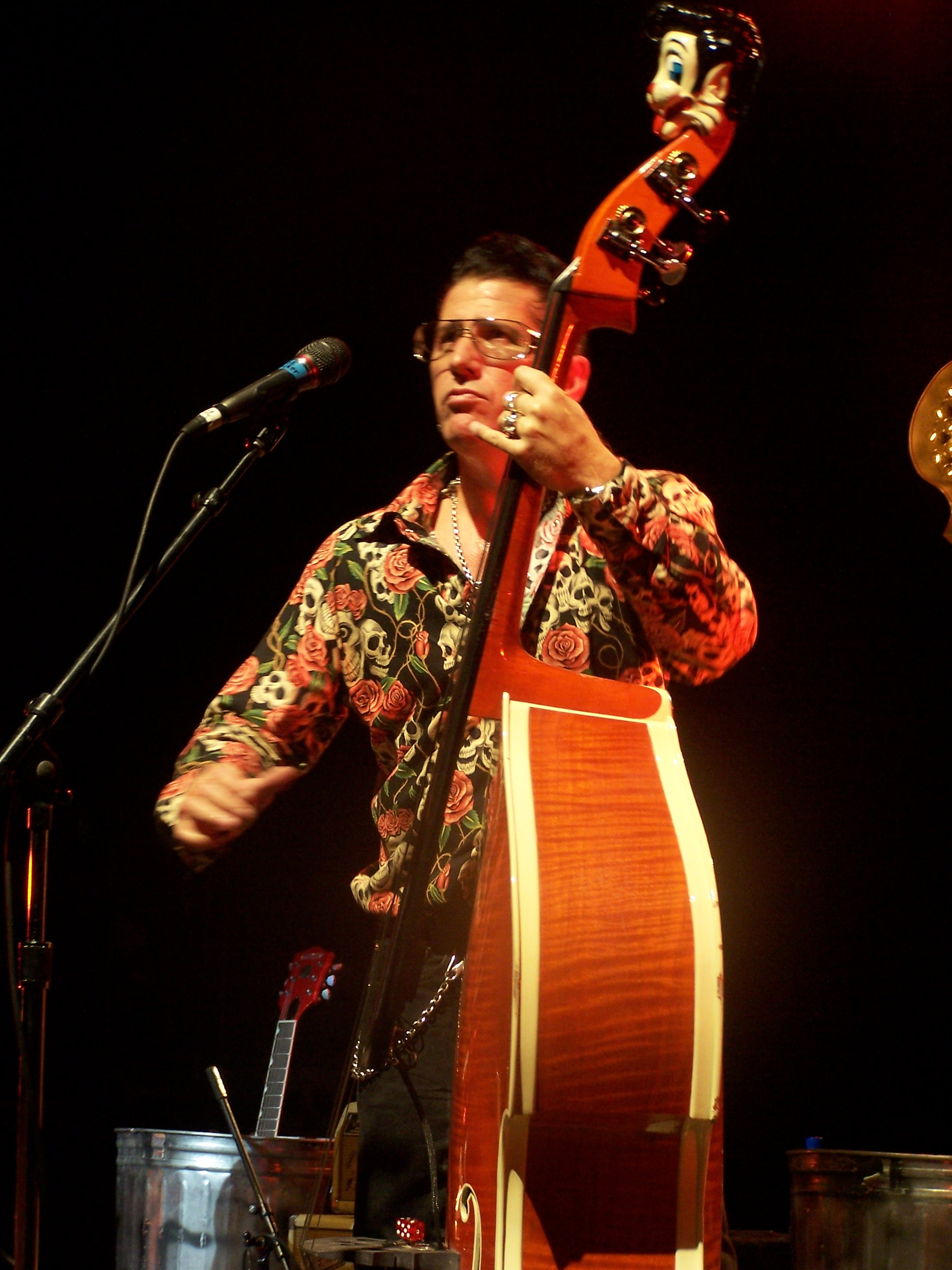
- Lee Rocker at Uptown Theatre, July 2007

Background information
- Born: Leon Drucker; August 3, 1961 (age 65); Long Island, New York, U.S.
- Genres: Pop, rock, blues, rockabilly
- Occupation: Musician
- Instruments: Bass, upright bass
- Years active: 1979–present
- Labels: 33rd Street, AFM, Alligator
- Website: www.leerocker.com

Leon Drucker (born August 3, 1961), professionally known as Lee Rocker is an American musician. He is a member of the rockabilly band Stray Cats.

He is the son of the classical clarinetists Stanley Drucker, the late former principal clarinetist of the New York Philharmonic Orchestra, and Naomi Drucker. As a child, he played the cello and later learned bass guitar.

== Biography ==
=== Personal life ===
Lee Rocker was born Leon Drucker in Massapequa, Long Island, New York, to a Jewish family in 1961. He is the son of classical clarinetists Stanley and Naomi Drucker. Stanley Drucker was the principal clarinetist for the New York Philharmonic Orchestra and played with Leonard Bernstein and Aaron Copland. His sister Roseanne is a country music singer-songwriter. Lee was named after the American clarinetist Leon Russianoff, a close friend of the Druckers.

At age 12, Rocker picked up the electric bass but quickly developed a preference for playing the double bass as his instrument of choice. He credits records by Elvis Presley and Carl Perkins for his new inclination "The slap bass on those records blew me away!" Rocker's favorite bass player is Willie Dixon.

He married his wife Deborah in 1989. She is the daughter of Gucci watchmaking pioneer Severin Wunderman. In the fall of 2013, she launched her own eponymous fashion line. They reside in Laguna Beach, California with their two children. Rocker is a fan of the Lakers and the Angels.

=== Career ===
Drucker's school friends included James McDonnell and Brian Setzer. The three of them played together regularly and widened their musical interests to include the blues and rockabilly. Drucker also learned to play the double bass to incorporate the sounds of blues and rockabilly on the acoustic instrument. The three of them formed the group Stray Cats in 1979. McDonnell took on the stage name of "Slim Jim Phantom", and Drucker devised his own stage name to "Lee Rocker". Rocker evolved his own style of slap-bass playing with the group.

Rocker and Stray Cats sold nearly 10 million albums and garnered twenty three gold and platinum certified records worldwide, and made them a mainstay on MTV. In addition to Stray Cats, Lee Rocker, and Phantom, Rocker & Slick albums, Rocker has recorded or performed with Carl Perkins, George Harrison, Ringo Starr, Willie Nelson, Leon Russell, Keith Richards, John Fogerty, and Scotty Moore. Rocker was nominated for a Grammy Award in 1982, as was his father, they are the second father-son duo to be nominated for a Grammy in the same year. He is considered to be an influential upright bassist in rock and roll.

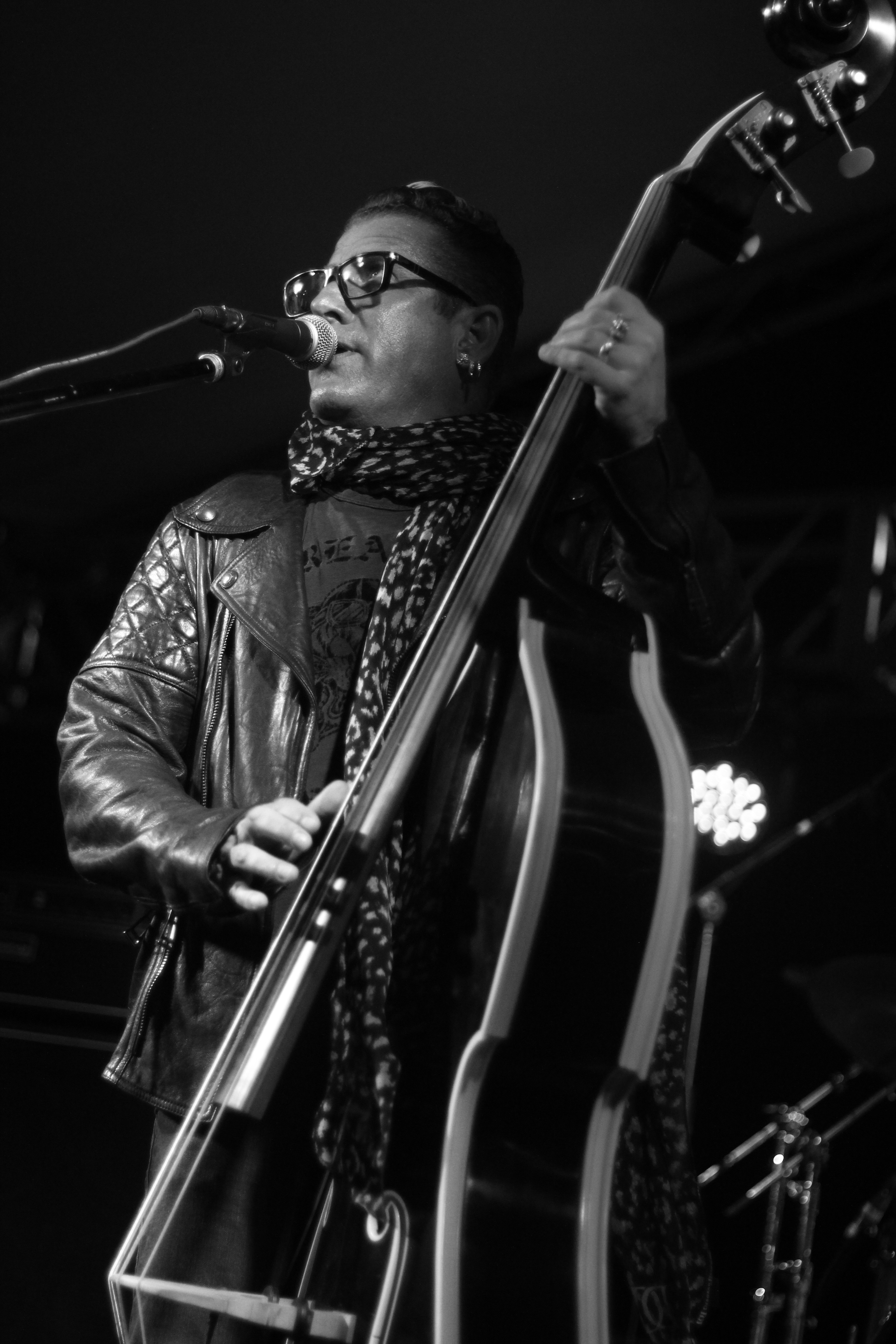
Lee Rocker performing at Memphis International Rockabilly Festival, August 2015

Accompanied by Slim Jim Phantom and guitarist Earl Slick, Rocker formed the band Phantom, Rocker & Slick and recorded two albums for EMI Records titled Phantom, Rocker & Slick and Cover Girl. The song "Men Without Shame" landing Rocker back on MTV and in the charts. For Black Top Records, Rocker released the albums Big Blue (1994) and Atomic Boogie Hour (1995). He has also recorded for Alligator Records.

He released the album, Bulletproof, in 2003. His other albums included Black Cat Bone, released in August 2007, which featured Brophy Dale on guitar and Jimmy Sage on drums. Buzz Campbell (Hot Rod Lincoln and Sha Na Na) joined the band three years prior and gave them a Gretsch guitar sound. In 2011, Lee released an EP called The Cover Sessions which features cover versions of songs such as the John Lennon/Paul McCartney song "Come Together", Elton John's "Honky Cat", and the Allman Brothers song "Ramblin' Man". In addition to recording and touring, Rocker has hosted a radio show on KXFM, Rumble and Twang with Lee Rocker. Lee Rocker joined the cast of the Broadway hit Million Dollar Quartet as bassist Clayton Perkins, the brother of Sun Records recording artist Carl Perkins in a twelve-show run from January 21 through 31, 2011. He topped off the show with a special encore performance with the cast and an appearance on New York Today.

Lee Rocker's latest band consists of Buzz Campbell (electric guitar & banjo), Larry Mitchel (drums), and Phil Parlapiano (piano, accordion, acoustic guitar).

=== The Low Road (2018–2019) ===
Lee's latest album The Low Road was recorded live with his four-piece band at Daryl's House in Pawling, NY (a listening room venue owned by Daryl Hall of Hall & Oates). Initially, it was released via physical prints of CD/DVDs & vinyl in December 2018. It was released via digital streaming on August 9, 2019

=== 40 & reunion tour with Stray Cats (2018–2019) ===
After a ten-year hiatus from Stray Cats, Rocker reunited on stage with Setzer and Phantom in 2018 at the Viva Las Vegas Festival and a 2019 summer world tour was announced. The Stray Cats released their tenth studio album 40 in May 2019.

=== "Dog House Shuffle" (2019) ===
On October 29, 2019, Billboard.com premiered Rocker's latest single and music video for "Dog House Shuffle". In an interview with the magazine, Rocker said about the song: "It's a tribute in a lot of ways...It's a song I wrote over the last couple of months. I was thinking about my career with 40 years of Stray Cats and all of that and thinking about the upright bass, which is what started this thing. It takes me back to the opening line of the song -- which is "Took me 'round the world and I changed my name/found a little fortune, found a little fame/Doin' the dog house shuffle"—which is right out of my story. Dog House is what they call the upright bass, so it's a tribute to the bass itself and a lot of the players that I came up listening to." On October 30, 2019, "Dog House Shuffle" was officially released on all digital platforms.

=== Awards and honors ===
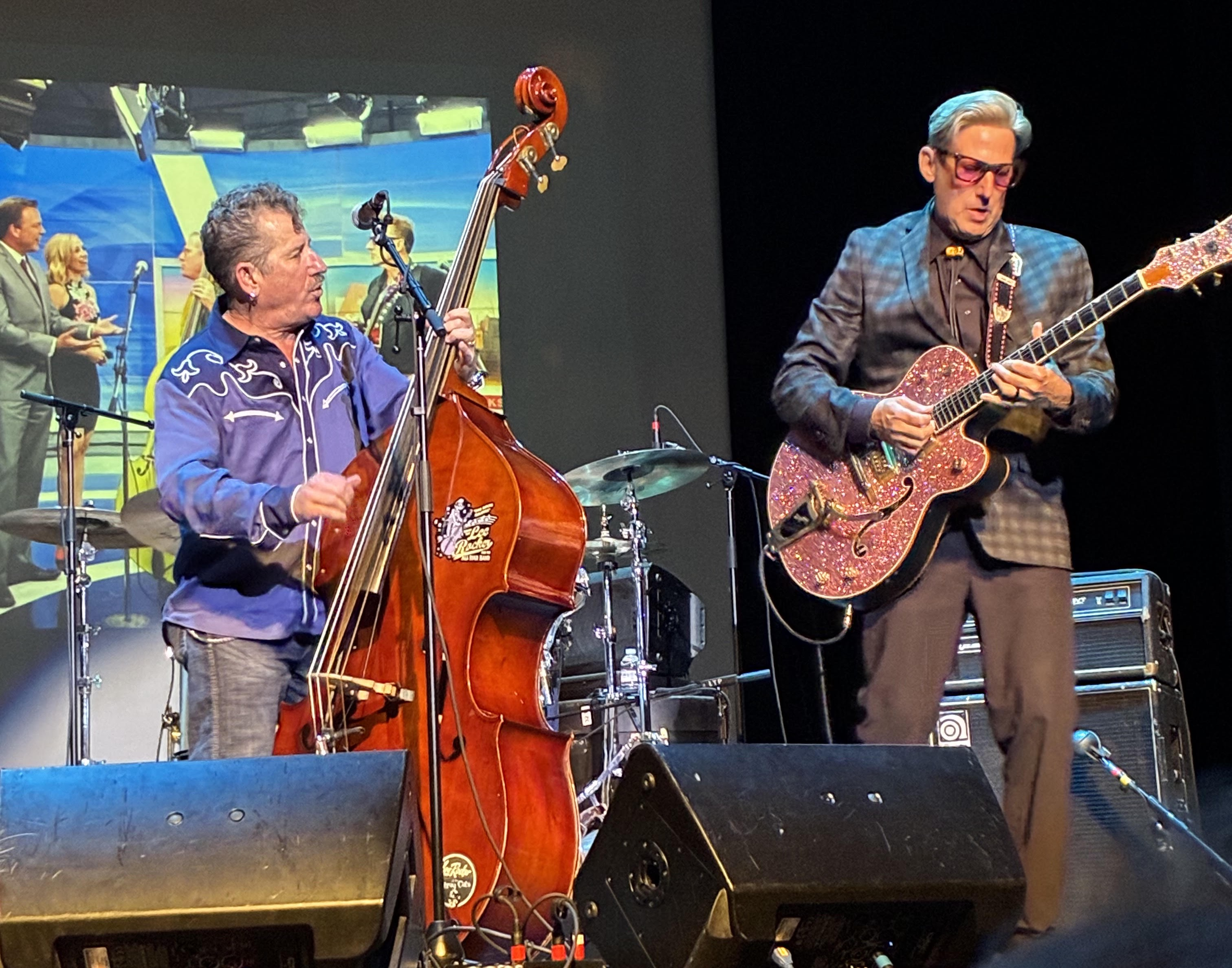
Lee Rocker (left) performing with touring guitarist Buzz Campbell at the Newberry Opera House in April 2026

In 2013, Rocker received a Lifetime Achievement Award from Bass Player magazine and gave master classes in London and Los Angeles. He is a member of the Long Island Music Hall of Fame and a recipient of the Visionary Artist Award from the Laguna Beach Arts Council.

== Discography ==
- Lee Rocker's Big Blue (1994)
- Atomic Boogie Hour (1995)
- No Cats (1998)
- Lee Rocker Live (1999)
- Blue Suede Nights (2001)
- Bulletproof (2003)
- Upright and Kickin' (2003)
- Burnin' Love: The Best of Lee Rocker (2004)
- The Curse of Rockabilly (2005)
- Racin' the Devil (2006)
- Black Cat Bone (2007)
- The Cover Sessions (2011)
- Night Train to Memphis (2012)
- The Low Road (2019)
- Gather Round (2021)
