= EMI America Records =

American record label

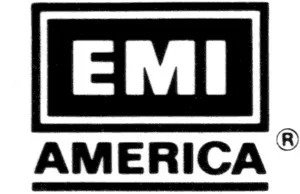
- Parent company: EMI (1978–1979, 1997); Thorn EMI (1979–1996)
- Founded: 1978; 48 years ago
- Founder: EMI
- Defunct: 1997; 29 years ago
- Distributor: Capitol Records
- Genre: Various
- Country of origin: United States
- Location: Los Angeles; New York City

EMI America Records was launched in 1978 by EMI as their second label in the United States after Capitol Records, relying on Capitol only for pressing, distribution, and international liaison.

In 1987, EMI America merged with Manhattan Records, resulting in the formation of EMI Manhattan Records. This entity underwent a rebranding in 1989, becoming known as EMI USA. In 1991, it joined the EMI Records Group North America (ERG) under the name EMI Records USA. The label was ultimately closed down in 1997, and its artists were split between Virgin Records America (acquired by Thorn EMI in 1992) and Capitol Records.

Since 2013, its catalog has been managed by Universal Music Group following their acquisition of EMI's recorded music division.

== Artists ==
Past artists have included: Marty Balin, Russ Ballard, Blessid Union of Souls, David Bowie, Kate Bush, Stray Cats, Lenny Burns, Kim Carnes, Sheena Easton, Joe "Bean" Esposito, Robin Gibb, Go West, Corey Hart (outside Canada), Murray Head, Kajagoogoo, Limahl, J. Geils, Michael Stanley Band, Naked Eyes, Queensrÿche, Barbara Mandrell, Pet Shop Boys, Red Hot Chili Peppers, Cliff Richard, Roxette, Steve Harley & Cockney Rebel, Talk Talk, George Thorogood and the Destroyers, John Waite, and Kim Wilde (US and Canada for most UK and other European artists).

== See also ==
- List of record labels
