= Slim Jim Phantom =

American rockabilly drummer

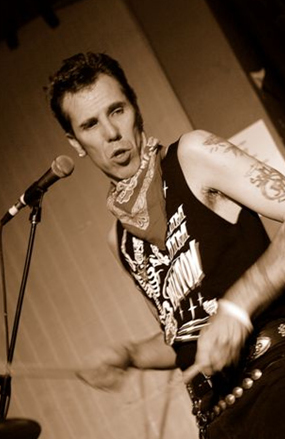
- Slim Jim Phantom – Australia and New Zealand tour (2006)

Background information
- Also known as: Slim Jim Phantom
- Born: James McDonnell; New York City, U.S.
- Genres: Rockabilly; rock and roll
- Occupations: Musician; songwriter
- Instruments: Drums; vocals
- Years active: 1979–present
- Labels: Arista; EMI America; Cleopatra
- Spouses: Britt Ekland (m. 1984; div. 1992) Jennie Vee (m. 2020)

James McDonnell, known by the stage name Slim Jim Phantom, is an American musician, best known as the drummer for the band Stray Cats. Alongside bandmates Brian Setzer and Lee Rocker, he is considered a pioneer of the neo-rockabilly movement of the early 1980s.

Phantom plays in the band Kat Men with former Imelda May guitarist Darrel Higham and is the host of the weekly radio show "Rockabilly Rave-up" on the satellite radio station Underground Garage.

== Biography ==
Born in Brooklyn and raised in Massapequa, New York, Phantom grew up listening to his parents' jazz and rock records and began playing drums by the age of ten. He took lessons with Mousie Alexander, who played with Benny Goodman, studying jazz and working through books by Jim Chapin and Ted Reed. Phantom has stated that discovering Elvis Presley's recordings from the Sun Records studio sessions was when he "felt that rock and roll changed my life."

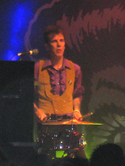
Phantom drumming on a two-piece kit while standing

By the late 1970s, Phantom was playing in bands with his childhood friend, bassist Lee Rocker. They soon joined forces with guitarist Brian Setzer to form Stray Cats. When performing with Stray Cats, Phantom did not sit behind a standard drum kit like most drummers, but instead opted to play in a standing position with a minimalist set-up of bass drum, snare drum, hi-hat, and crash cymbal.

During downtime from Stray Cats, Phantom played in swing, rockabilly, and jump blues combo Swing Cats with Rocker and ex-Polecats guitarist Danny B. Harvey, as well as rockabilly and glam rock project Phantom, Rocker & Slick with Rocker and guitarist Earl Slick. In 1985, he appeared with Carl Perkins and a host of other musicians including Eric Clapton, George Harrison, Ringo Starr, Dave Edmunds and Rosanne Cash for Blue Suede Shoes: A Rockabilly Session in London, England. Phantom also played with Jerry Lee Lewis.

During the late 1990s and early 2000s, Phantom formed the rockabilly supergroup The Head Cat with Danny B. Harvey and Motörhead vocalist and bassist Lemmy, the eponymous roots-rock band Slim Jim's Phantom Trio, the rock band Col. Parker with former Guns N' Roses guitarist Gilby Clarke, and joined the rock and roll supergroup Dead Men Walking with Kirk Brandon, Mike Peters and Captain Sensible. Phantom also hosts the "Rockabilly Rave-up show" on Little Steven's Underground Garage.

In 2021, Phantom formed a rockabilly band with Jimmy Barnes and Chris Cheney. In March 2023, Barnes announced the supergroup The Barnestormers, featuring Barnes, Cheney, Phantom with Jools Holland and Kevin Shirley. A self-titled album was released on 26 May 2023.

== Personal life ==
Phantom was married to Swedish actress Britt Ekland from 1984 to 1992 and has a son, T.J. (born 1988), with her. As of 2020, he was married to musician and solo artist Jennie Vee.

== Discography ==
=== With Swing Cats ===
- Swing Cats (1999)
- A Special Tribute to Elvis (2000)
- Swing Cat Stomp (2000)
- A Rock'A-Billy Christmas (2002)

=== With The Head Cat ===
- Lemmy, Slim Jim & Danny B (2000)
- Fool's Paradise (2006)
- Walk the Walk...Talk the Talk (2011)

=== With Col Parker ===
- Rock N Roll Music (2001)

=== With 13 Cats ===
- In the Beginning (2002)
- 13 Tracks (2003)
- In the Beginning 2 (2004)

=== With Dead Men Walking ===
- Live at Leeds (2003)
- Live at Darwen (2004)
- Live at CBGB's New York City (2005)
- Graveyard Smashes Volume 1 (2006)

=== With Kat Men ===
- Kat Men (2006)
- The Kat Men Cometh (2013)

=== With The Barnestormers ===
- The Barnestormers (2023)
