= Rockin' Rudolph =

Studio album by The Brian Setzer Orchestra
- Released: October 16, 2015
- Genre: Swing; rockabilly
- Length: 33:53
- Label: Surfdog
- Producer: Peter Collins

The Brian Setzer Orchestra chronology
| Don't Mess with a Big Band (Live!) (2010) | Rockin' Rudolph (2015) |

Singles from Rockin' Rudolph
- 1. "Yabba-Dabba Yuletide" Released: October 2, 2015

Rockin' Rudolph is the third Christmas album by The Brian Setzer Orchestra, released on October 16, 2015, through Surfdog Records. Produced by Peter Collins, it is the band's first Christmas album in ten years and their most recent album to date.

== Promotion ==
In support of the album, The Brian Setzer Orchestra embarked on the 12th Annual Christmas Rocks! Tour. In the midst of the tour they performed at an invitation-only event for SiriusXM at The Hard Rock Café in Times Square. The concert was broadcast across SiriusXM channels in the days that followed.

== Critical reception ==
Professional ratings
Review scores
| Source | Rating |
|---|---|
| AllMusic | 3/5 stars |

Stephen Thomas Erlewine of AllMusic rated the album three out of five stars and states: "Rockin' Rudolph deserves to sit proudly alongside the Brian Setzer Orchestra's other Christmas albums because it serves up snazzy seasonal swingers, tunes that revel in their retro-kitsch."

== Track listing ==
Rockin' Rudolph track listing
| No. | Title | Writer(s) | Length |
|---|---|---|---|
| 1. | "Rockin' Around the Christmas Tree" | Johnny Marks | 2:31 |
| 2. | "Yabba-Dabba Yuletide" | Joseph Barbera, William Hanna, Hoyt Curtin | 2:01 |
| 3. | "Most Wonderful Time of the Year" | Edward Pola, George Wyle | 2:11 |
| 4. | "Rockabilly Rudolph" | Marks | 2:51 |
| 5. | "Here Comes Santa Claus" | Gene Autry, Oakley Haldeman | 4:17 |
| 6. | "Have Yourself a Merry Little Christmas" | Hugh Martin, Ralph Blane | 3:29 |
| 7. | "Swingin' Joy" | Traditional | 2:20 |
| 8. | "Carol of the Bells" | Mykola Leontovych, Peter Wilhousky | 2:23 |
| 9. | "Little Jack Frost" | Al Stillman, Seger Ellis | 2:53 |
| 10. | "Hark! The Herald Angels Sing" | Charles Wesley | 2:26 |
| 11. | "O Little Town of Bethlehem" | Phillips Brooks | 2:51 |
| 12. | "Yabba-Dabba Yuletide (extended)" | Barbera, Hanna, Curtin | 3:40 |

Rockin' Rudolph – Deluxe PledgeMusic exclusive version (bonus tracks)
| No. | Title | Writer(s) | Length |
|---|---|---|---|
| 13. | "Little Drummer Boy (instrumental)" | Harry Simeone, K.K. Davis, Henry Onorati |
| 14. | "Deck the Halls (instrumental)" | Traditional |

== Personnel ==
Credits adapted from AllMusic:

Production

- Brian Setzer – arranger
- Peter Collins – producer
- Steve Gibson – producer
- Terry Christian – engineer, mixing
- Don Cobb – mastering
- Eric Conn – mastering
- Dave Darling – additional production
- Frank Comstock – arranger
- Mark Jones – arranger
- Dave Kaplan – executive producer
- Tim Messina – music director
- Jody Nardone – vocal arrangement
- Kristen Carranza – production coordination
- Joey Waterman – production coordination
- Tyler Sweet – guitar technician
- Derek Yaniger – cover art
- Scott Anderson – layout

Musicians

- Brian Setzer – guitar, vocals
- Roy Agee – trombone
- Sean Billings – trumpet
- Ron Blake – trumpet
- Mike Briones – trombone
- Shannon Brown – vocals (background)
- Barry Green – trombone
- John Hatton – bass guitar
- Mike Haynes – trumpet
- Robbie Hioki – trombone
- Jamie Hovorka – trumpet
- Paul Leim – drums
- Sam Levine – saxophone
- Jeremy Levy – trombone
- Kerry Loeschen – trombone
- Tim Messina – saxophone
- Eric Morones – saxophone
- Jody Nardone – vocals (background)
- Steve Patrick – trumpet
- Charlie Peterson – saxophone
- Tony Pia – drums
- Steve Reid – trumpet
- Matt Rollings – piano
- Julie Setzer – vocals (background)
- Leslie Spencer – vocals (background)
- David Spicher – bass
- Jim Youngstrom – saxophone
- Matt Zebly – saxophone

== Chart performance ==
Chart performance for Rockin' Rudolph
| Chart (2015) | Peak position |
|---|---|
| Belgian Albums (Ultratop Wallonia) | 192 |
| US Independent Albums (Billboard) | 9 |
| US Top Holiday Albums (Billboard) | 3 |

== Release history ==
Release history and formats for Rockin' Rudolph
| Region | Date | Format(s) | Label |
|---|---|---|---|
| United States | October 16, 2015 | CD; digital download; vinyl | Surfdog |
