= Diet for a New America (album) =

Studio album by 58
- Released: June 20, 2000
- Genres: Alternative rock; hip hop
- Length: 46:16
- Label: Americoma
- Producer: Dave Darling

Diet for a New America is the only record of American band 58, the group featuring Nikki Sixx. It was released on Sixx's Americoma Records on June 20, 2000.

== Conception and production ==
Nikki Sixx described in an interview the origins of the album, beginning with a jam session with guitarist Dave Darling of the band Boxing Gandhis: "One day we were sitting around; he had this hip-hop loop up, and I was playing this glamrock riff; and he goes, 'Wow, that's really fucked up. You hear how that sounds together?' I said, 'Yeah, it's horrible, huh?' So we started to roll tape."

He and Darling continued the casual approach—or what Sixx described as "complete reckless abandon"—to making the album, for example flipping a coin to see who would play instruments on which track or who would write lyrics. "Then we got to the point where we didn't even write lyrics—we just made them up on the spot. To this day I don't know any of them." Sixx expected the casual approach might be part of the album's appeal: "If people like it, they can like it for the music, not because it's being shoved down their throats by a record company."

Various musicians contributed, in a haphazard way. Said Sixx, "A bunch of musicians just came by and played. I don't even know who half of them are." A friend of Darling played upright bass on the track "Queer".

Sixx wanted a 1970s song to cover, and his first choice, "One" by Three Dog Night, had recently been covered by Aimee Mann for the movie Magnolia. Sixx searched the Internet for #1 songs of the 1970s and came up with "Alone Again (Naturally)". Darling said of the selection, "The tune was so bizarre to begin with that the idea of making that fit onto our record was a bit of a challenge."

"Song to Slit Your Wrists By" was previously released by Sixx's other band, Mötley Crüe, as the Japanese bonus track for Generation Swine. It is the same recording as the album version.

== Critical reception ==
Professional ratings
Review scores
Source	Rating
Allmusic	3/5 stars

Reviews were mixed. David Glessner of the San Antonio Express-News wrote, "It's catchy, memorable, sleazy and worth checking out." In contrast, Sonia Murray of The Atlanta Journal-Constitution wrote, "58 attempts too many styles and proves a master at none, and features Sixx's typically addlebrained lyrics."

== Track listing ==
All songs written by Nikki Sixx and Dave Darling, except "Alone Again (Naturally)" written by Gilbert O'Sullivan and "Who We Are" written by Nikki Sixx, Dave Darling and Steve Gibb.

1. "Don't Laugh (You Might Be Next)" – 3:30
2. "El Paso" – 4:44
3. "Piece of Candy" – 5:23
4. "Shopping Cart Jesus" – 4:12
5. "Queer" – 4:39
6. "Song to Slit Your Wrists By" – 3:07
7. "Stormy" – 3:38
8. "Killing Joke" – 4:04
9. "All My Heroes Are Dead" – 5:03
10. "Alone Again (Naturally)" – 4:09
11. "Who We Are" – 1:52
