= Songs from Lonely Avenue =

Songs From Lonely Avenue

Studio album by The Brian Setzer Orchestra
- Released: 2009
- Length: 52:00
- Label: Surfdog
- Producer: Brian Setzer, Dave Darling, Mark Stockert

The Brian Setzer Orchestra chronology
Ultimate Christmas Collection (2008)	Songs From Lonely Avenue (2009)	Don't Mess With A Big Band (Live!) (2010)

Songs From Lonely Avenue is the eighth studio album from the American swing revival band The Brian Setzer Orchestra, released in 2009. This is the first album to feature all original songs written by Brian Setzer.

== Track listing ==
1. "Trouble Train" 4:41
2. "Dead Man Incorporated" 5:19
3. "Kiss Me Deadly" 5:58
4. "Gimme Some Rhythm Daddy" 2:34
5. "Lonely Avenue" 5:21
6. "King of the Whole Damn World" 3:54
7. "Mr. Jazzer Goes Surfin' 4:10
8. "Mr. Surfer Goes Jazzin' 3:02
9. "My Baby Don't Love Me Blues" 3:42
10. "Love Partners in Crime" 2:12
11. "Passion of the Night" 3:12
12. "Dimes in the Jar" 5:00
13. "Elena" 2:55

== Charts ==
Chart (2009)	Peak position
US Billboard 200	123
