= Brie Howard-Darling =

American singer-songwriter (born 1949)

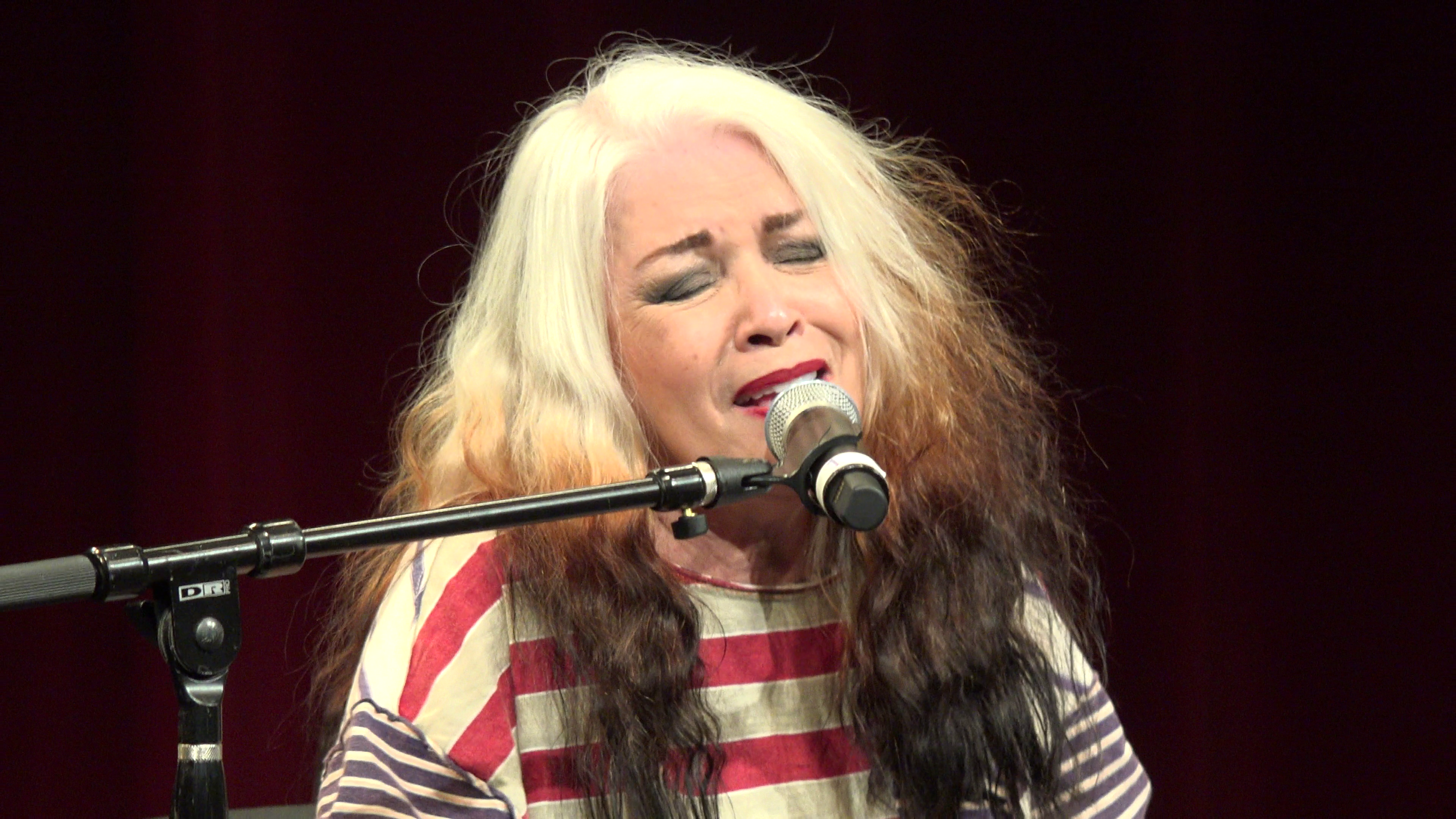
- photo from the Fanny film preview in NYC in 2021
- Born: Maria Berry; August 9, 1949 (age 77); Stockton, California, U.S.
- Occupations: Musician; Singer; Songwriter
- Years active: 1964–present
- Spouses: Mike Brandt (m. 1967; div. 1972) James Newton Howard (m. 1974; div. 1978) Dave Darling (m. 1993)
- Children: Brandi Brandt
- Musical career
- Genres: Rock; Pop; Funk; Soul
- Instruments: Drums; Vocals; Percussion
- Labels: Casablanca; IRS; Mesa Blue Moon Records; Atlantic; Blue Elan
- Website: www.briedarling.com

Brie Howard-Darling (also known and credited as Brie Darling, Brie Howard, Brie Brandt and Brie Berry; born August 9, 1949) is an American drummer, singer, percussionist, and songwriter. She has recorded with such recording artists as Carole King, Ringo Starr, ELO, Keith Moon, The Temptations, Jimmy Buffett, Melissa Manchester, Janiva Magness, and Glen Campbell. She has toured extensively with Martin Mull, Kiki Dee, Jack Wagner, Bruce Willis, Robert Palmer, Jimmy Buffett, Robbie Nevil, and Duran Duran. She has been a band member of Fanny, American Girls, Boxing Gandhis, Fanny Walked The Earth, and Cherie Currie & Brie Darling.

== Early life ==
Howard-Darling was born (August 9, 1949) in Stockton, California, and raised in Folsom, California, a suburb of Sacramento, California, to parents Elmo Robert Berry and Angeles Calamaya.

She began performing professionally at fourteen years old with the band, The Kee-Notes, and became a member of the Sacramento Musician's Union in 1964. In 1965 the band recorded three songs for Esar Records, making Darling one of the first female rock drummers to record rock music. She credits her younger and older brothers as her greatest early influences, as they were both musicians, and there was a drum kit in their living room where she could practice. In 1966, she joined the all-female Sacramento band The Svelts, which would later evolve into Fanny, becoming the first all-woman band to be signed to a major record label to record a full album.

In 1967, Howard-Darling married Mike Brandt. She gave birth to her daughter Brandi Brandt in 1968.

== Career ==
=== Fanny ===
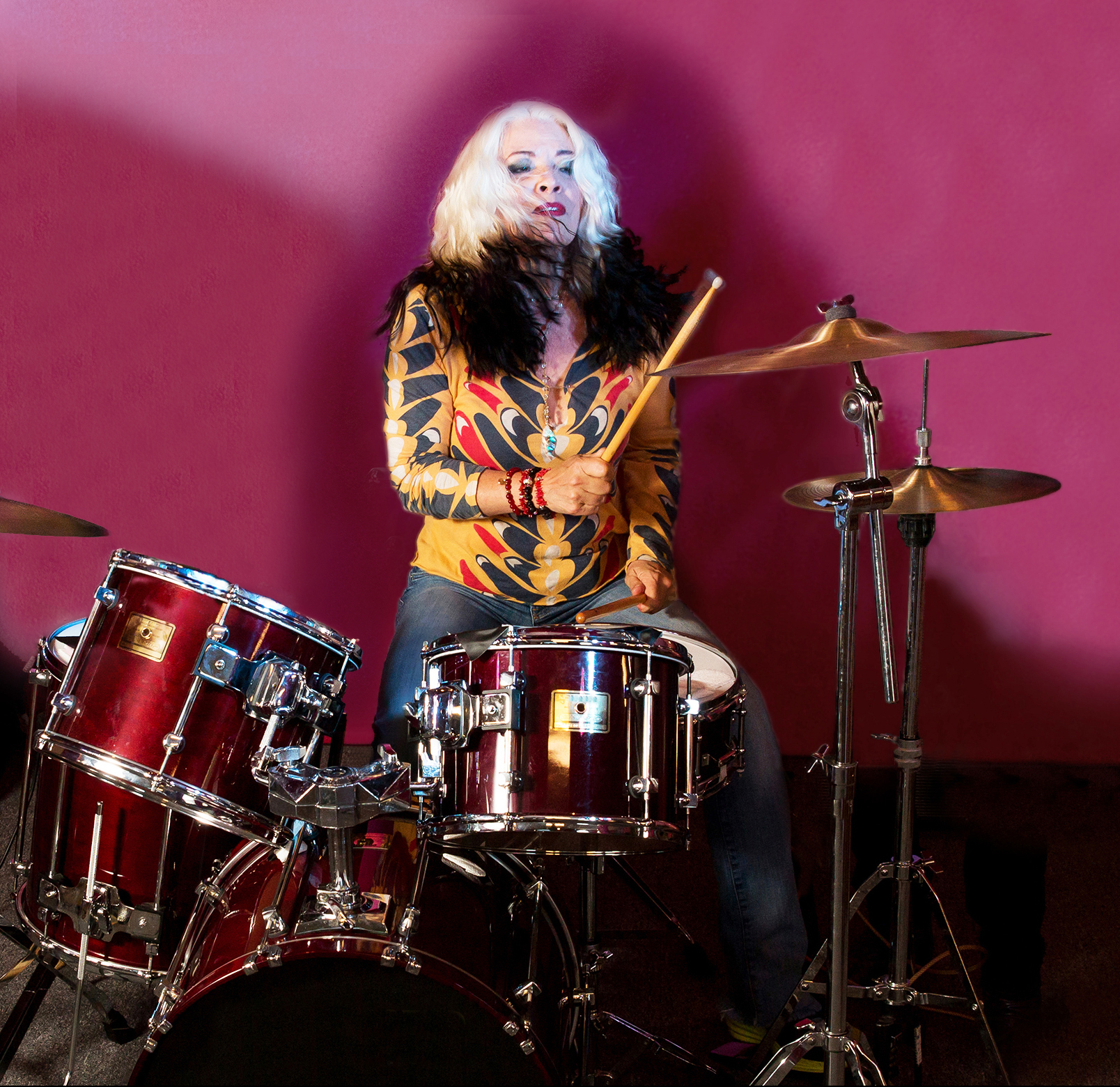
Howard-Darling in 2017

Howard-Darling joined former band members in Los Angeles in 1970, forming a short-lived lineup of the all-female band Fanny as the lead singer. A decision was made to change the number of band members from five members to four creating more of a Fab Four image. She left the band and pursued other musical ventures.

Howard-Darling rejoined Fanny in 1974, recording Rock and Roll Survivors released on Casablanca Records. The first single, "I've Had It" reached number 79 on the Billboard Hot 100. Their second single, Butter Boy, spent 11 weeks on the Billboard Hot 100 peaking at number 29 on April 5, 1975. Fanny was the first all-woman rock band to release an album on a major label. After a U.S. tour promoting the album, Darling (Brie Howard) left the band.

David Bowie said of Fanny in 1999 to Rolling Stone:

They were one of the finest ... rock bands of their time. They were extraordinary: They wrote everything ... they were just colossal and wonderful, and nobody's ever mentioned them. They're as important as anybody else who's ever been, ever; it just wasn't their time.

In 2018, original band members Jean Millington (bass), June Millington (lead guitar), and Howard-Darling reunited as Fanny Walked the Earth, releasing an eponymous album, their first recording together in more than 40 years. It features several female musicians who have credited Fanny with helping open the door for them decades ago, among them the Runaways’ Cherie Currie, the Go-Go's Kathy Valentine, the Bangles’ Susanna Hoffs, Vicki and Debbi Peterson, veteran rock singer and musician Genya Ravan and former Fanny member Patti Quatro, the sister of Suzi Quatro.

Howard-Darling was featured prominently in the 2021 documentary film Fanny: The Right to Rock, directed by Bobbi Jo Hart. The film presents a history of the band from their origins through Fanny Walked the Earth.

=== American Girls ===
American Girls (band) were an American all-female band based in California, United States. The band consisted of Howard-Darling (vocals, drums, percussion), Hilary Shepard (vocals, percussion), DB Tressler (guitar), Miiko Watanabe (bass, backing vocals) and Teresa James (keyboards, backing vocals). Original members included Louise Goffin (rhythm guitar, lead and backing vocals) and Daryl Hannah (keyboards).

American Girls released one album in 1986 titled American Girls. The video for their single "American Girl" received some airplay on MTV. Their song "Androgynous" appeared in the 1986 film Tough Guys, and the song "American Girl" appeared on the soundtrack for Out of Bounds. They also opened for The Lords of the New Church on 1986 tour dates.

Miles Copeland III (brother of the Police's Stewart Copeland) was the band's manager.

=== Touring drummer, percussionist and vocalist ===
Aside from Howard-Darling's own music projects and bands, she has toured extensively with other successful recording artists, most notably with Carole King, Jimmy Buffett and Robert Palmer. Starting in 1990, she toured with King as a percussionist and vocalist for five years in the U.S. and internationally. Darling performed with Jimmy Buffett on five tours over a span of five years and with Robert Palmer for two U.S. tours and one international tour.

=== Boxing Gandhis ===
Howard-Darling and her husband Dave Darling are the founders of Boxing Gandhis, who were signed to the record label Mesa in 1993. The band has recorded three albums. They climbed the charts with a number 5 hit on the Billboard Triple A (Adult Album Alternative) chart with the song If You Love Me (Why Am I Dyin') from their debut album after touring the US as opening act for the Dave Matthews Band and Big Head Todd and the Monsters. The song's music video also garnered a Billboard Music Award for "Best Jazz/Adult Contemporary" which was directed by Brian Lockwood (director). If You Love Me (Why Am I Dyin') was featured in Episode 3 of the 2011 season of the HBO Original Series True Blood.

- Boxing Gandhis (1994, Mesa Records)
- Howard (1996, Atlantic Records)
- Culture War (2019, Blue Elan Records)

=== Fanny Walked The Earth ===
In 2016, Howard-Darling joined a live performance by her former Fanny bandmates June and Jean Millington. This inspired the formation of a new band called Fanny Walked the Earth. An album of all-new songs with the same title was released in March 2018. The album marks the first time June, Jean, and Brie all recorded at the same time in over 40 years.

=== Cherie Currie and Brie Darling ===
Currie and Howard-Darling (credited as Brie Darling) recorded The Motivator, a full-length album that was released on August 2, 2019, on Blue Elan Records.

== Filmography ==
=== Acting ===
- 1982 Android as Maggie
- 1986 Simon & Simon as Hooker
- 1987 The Return of Bruno as The Singers
- 1987 Alexander O'Neal: Criticize as Drummer
- 1988 Tapeheads as Flygirl
- 1989 The Runnin' Kind as "Thunder"
- 1990 General Hospital as Congas
- 1994 Somebody to Love as Band Member

=== Music videos and television appearances ===
Howard-Darling has performed with a variety of recording artists on television shows such as American Bandstand, Soul Train, The David Letterman Show, The Tonight Show, Don Kirshner's Rock Concert, The Midnight Special, The Joan Rivers Show, and The Mike Douglas Show.

- 1986 Robbie Nevil - "C'est la Vie" - Music Video - Percussion and Vocals - MTV Music Video Award - Best Cinematography
- 1986 Robbie Nevil - "Wot's It To Ya" - Music Video - Percussion and Vocals
- 1986 Robbie Nevil - "Dominoes" - Music Video - Percussion and Vocals
- 1987 Deniece Williams - "Never Say Never" - Music Video - Percussion and Vocals
- 1987 Alexander O'Neal - "Criticize" - Music Video - Percussion and Vocals
- 1990 A'me Lorain - "Whole Wide World" - Music Video - Percussion
- 1990 Natalie Cole - "Wild Women Do" - Music Video - Percussion and Vocals
- 1990 Carole King - In Concert Televised Concert - Percussion and Vocals
- 1991 Robbie Nevil - "Just Like You" - Music Video - Percussion and Vocals
- 1993 Boxing Gandhis - "If You Love Me (Why Am I Dyin')" - Music Video - Percussion and Vocals - VH1 Music Award
- 1993 Culture Clash TV Series - Band Member
- 2000 Don't Forget Your Toothbrush - Band Member
- 2017 Women of Rock Oral History Project at the Sophia Smith Collection, Smith College

== Nightline - Michael Jackson Thriller album ==
"Nightline", a song co-written by Howard-Darling, Glen Ballard and Davey Faragher, was recorded by Michael Jackson and slated to be released on Michael Jackson's Thriller album in 1982 but was pulled before the release. The song had been recently recorded and released by Randy Crawford, The Pointer Sisters, and Ellen Foley.

== Brie Darling Cakes ==
Howard-Darling began creating artistic cakes in 2010. Darling invented the process of baking leopard print cakes.

=== Cake Wars ===
In 2016, she and her granddaughter, Storm Sixx, won 1st place and $10,000 as contestants in Season 2 of the Food Network's Cake Wars, where four bakers face off to have their cakes featured in a special event.

== Discography ==
Year	Album	Artist	Credit
2019	The Motivator	Cherie Currie & Brie Darling	Drums, Percussion, Vocals, and Composer
2019	Culture War	Boxing Gandhis	Drums, Vocals, Composer
2018	Fanny Walked The Earth	Fanny Walked The Earth	Composer, Drums, Vocals, Artwork
2018	All The Time	The Temptations	Percussion
2018	Love Is An Army	Janiva Magness	Percussion
2016	Love Wins Again	Janiva Magness	Percussion, Vocals
2014	Original	Janiva Magness	Percussion, Vocals
2013	See You There	Glen Campbell	Percussion
2012	Stronger For It	Janiva Magness	Percussion
2008	What Love Will Do	Janiva Magness	Percussion, Vocals
2003	Use What You Got	Janiva Magness	Percussion, Vocals
2000	Diet For A New America	58	Vocals
1998	Sounds Of Wood and Steel		Percussion
1998	What You See Is What You Get: The Very Best Of Precious Metal	Precious Metal	Vocals
1996	Howard	Boxing Gandhis	Composer, Vocals, Percussion
1994	Boxing Gandhis	Boxing Gandhis	Composer, Vocals, Percussion
1994	In Concert	Carole King	Percussion, Vocals
1993	Another Breath	Ellen Foley	Composer
1992	Boats, Beaches, Bars & Ballads	Jimmy Buffett	Percussion, Vocals
1992	Dead Flowers	Edan	Vocals, Choir
1990	Son Of Albert	Albert Ridgeley	Vocals
1990	Holes In The Heavens	Warpipes	Vocals
1990	Feeding Frenzy: Jimmy Buffett Live!	Jimmy Buffett	Vocals
1990	Arachnophobia (film)	Original Soundtrack	Percussion
1987	Don't Give Up Your Day Job	Jack Wagner	Vocals
1986	American Girls	American Girls	Composer, Drums, Percussion, Vocals
1985	Don't Give Up Your Day Job	Jack Wagner	Vocals
1983	Another Breath	Ellen Foley	Composer
1983	Break Out	Pointer Sisters	Composer
1983	Nightline	Randy Crawford	Composer
1982	Let Me Rock You	Peter Criss	Composer
1978	It's In Everyone One Of Us	Mary Travers	Vocals
1978	Portrait	Lynda Carter	Vocals
1977	Ringo the 4th	Ringo Starr	Vocals
1977	Victory In Rock City	Roderick Falconer	Vocals
1977	Singin'	Melissa Manchester	Vocals
1976	Help Is On The Way	Melissa Manchester	Vocals
1976	Gino Cunico	Gino Cunico	Vocals
1976	A New World Record	ELO	Vocals
1976	It's In Every One Of Us	David Pomeranz	Vocals
1975	Melissa	Melissa Manchester	Vocals
1975	Rock and Roll Survivors	Fanny	Drums, Vocals
1975	Two Sides of the Moon	Keith Moon	Vocals
1974	James Newton Howard	James Newton Howard	Drums
1972	Earthquire	Earthquire	Vocals
1965	"Quit Changing Your Mind"/"Please Don't Tell Me No" (Singles)	The Kee-Notes	Drums, Vocals
