= Don't Mess with a Big Band (Live!) =

Don't Mess With a Big Band (Live!)

Live album by The Brian Setzer Orchestra
- Released: July 2010
- Length: 1:26:57
- Label: Surfdog

The Brian Setzer Orchestra chronology
Songs from Lonely Avenue (2009)	Don't Mess With a Big Band (Live!) (2010)	Rockin’ Rudolph (2015)

Don't Mess With a Big Band (Live!) is a live album from the American swing revival band The Brian Setzer Orchestra, released in 2010.

== Track listing ==
=== Disc 1 ===
No.	Title	Length
1.	"Batman"	2:46
2.	"Drive Like Lightning (Crash Like Thunder)"	4:31
3.	"'49 Mercury Blues"	3:29
4.	"Good Rockin' Daddy"	5:53
5.	"Your True Love"	3:51
6.	"The Dirty Boogie"	3:15
7.	"Sleepwalk"	4:48
8.	"Honey Man"	3:28
9.	"This Cat's On A Hot Tin Roof"	2:52
10.	"Summertime Blues"	3:07

=== Disc 2 ===
No.	Title	Length
1.	"Runaway Boys"	4:00
2.	"Gina"	3:45
3.	"Gene & Eddie"	4:09
4.	"Fishnet Stockings"	6:47
5.	"Stray Cat Strut"	5:56
6.	"Jump, Jive, An' Wail"	6:34
7.	"Rumble In Brighton"	5:19
8.	"Rock This Town"	8:21
9.	"The House Is Rockin'"	4:06
