= Find Your Wings =

Studio album by Anna Danes
- Released: 2016
- Recorded: 2016
- Studio: Capitol (Hollywood)
- Genre: Jazz
- Length: 44:42
- Label: DLG
- Producer: Dave Darling

Anna Danes chronology
Longing (2014)	Find Your Wings (2016)

Find Your Wings, the second album by American singer-songwriter Anna Danes, is a collection of jazz standards and original songs. It was released in the US by DLG Recordings in 2016. The album peaked at No. 22 on the jazz chart at Billboard magazine.

Danes delivered a TEDx event talk, titled, Find Your Wings, in Solana Beach, California, on August 25, 2018. She spoke about surviving breast cancer and escaping communist Poland when she was ten years old. She sang the title track from her album a cappella after her talk.

== Track listing ==
No.	Title	Writer(s)	Length
1.	"When You Were My King"	Janiva Magness, Andrew John Lowden, Lauren Michelle Bliss	4:31
2.	"I Will Wait for You"	Michel Legrand, Norman Gimbel, Jacques Demy	4:43
3.	"It's Crazy"	Artie Butler, Sammy Cahn	4:25
4.	"I Want to Be Around, Cry Me a River"	Johnny Mercer, Sadie Vimmerstedt, Arthur Hamilton	4:18
5.	"Find Your Wings"	Danes, Cindy Alexander	3:12
6.	"That's All"	Sister Rosetta Tharpe	4:07
7.	"Long Distance"	Danes, Dave Darling	3:46
8.	"In the Wee Small Hours"	David Mann, Bob Hilliard	3:30
9.	"See You in L.A."	Danes, Alexander	3:52
10.	"Mr. OMG"	Danes, Mary Harris	5:04
11.	"The Voice"	Danes, Alexander	3:22
12.	"I Love You"	Danes	5:04

== Personnel ==
- Anna Danes – vocals
- Rich Ruttenberg – music arranger, piano
- Trey Henry – bass
- John Ferraro – drums

== Release history ==
Region	Date	Format	Label
United States	2016	CD, digital download	DLG Recordings
