= Hilary Shepard =

American actress

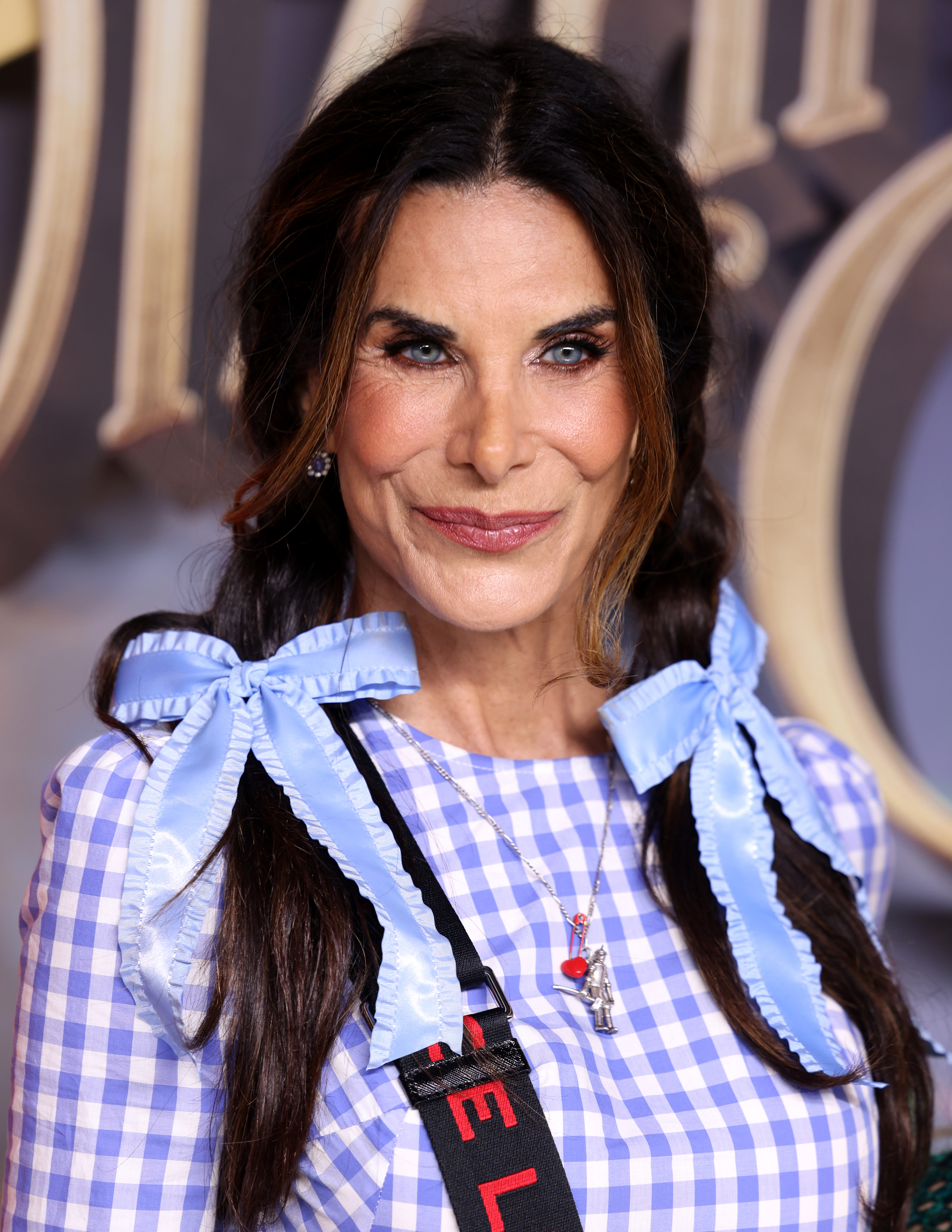
- Shepard in 2025
- Born: New York City, U.S.
- Occupations: Actress, singer
- Years active: 1982–present

Hilary Shepard, alternately billed as Hilary Shepard-Turner, is an American actress and singer. She began her career in the mid-1980s, as co-lead singer and percussionist in the girl group American Girls, while also starting to appear in small roles in film and on television. Her film and television career expanded with larger roles in numerous series and films. She may be best known for her starring role as the evil pirate queen Divatox in Power Rangers Turbo and Turbo: A Power Rangers Movie, as well as the genetically enhanced Lauren in two episodes of Star Trek: Deep Space Nine.

== Biography ==
Shepard was born in New York City, New York. In the mid-1980s, Shepard was a co-lead singer and percussionist in the short-lived all-female group American Girls. American Girls originally started as a film project, which fizzled. After some personnel changes and more rehearsing, the band sustained many comparisons to the Go-Go's, who were popular at the time as well assigned to the same label, IRS Records. However, American Girls featured veterans of the all-women band scene including Brie Howard who had played drums for Fanny and Miiko Watanabe who played bass with the Screamin' Sirens. They recorded one album only, which was intended as a demo but was pressed to vinyl in its original form. The eponymous debut album was released in March 1986. The cover shows the band in a hotel room, with alcohol, a deck of cards, and a copy of The National Enquirer. The video for their single "American Girl" received some airplay on MTV. Their song "Androgynous" appeared in the 1986 film Tough Guys and the song "American Girl" appeared on the soundtrack for Out of Bounds. They also opened for The Lords of the New Church on 1986 tour dates.

When that group ended, she moved into acting, appearing in numerous motion picture and television series.

== Career ==
Shepard's film career includes: Summer Lovers (1982), Weekend Pass (1984), Private Resort (1985), Radioactive Dreams (1985), Tough Guys (1986), Hunk (1987), Lucky Stiff (1988), Troop Beverly Hills (1989), Peacemaker (1990), Scanner Cop (1994), Turbo: A Power Rangers Movie (1997), The 40-Year-Old Virgin (2005), and Going Shopping (2005).

In 1992, she guest-starred in two episodes of Full House's sixth season as KFLH D.J. Julie in "Radio Days" and "Lovers And Other Tanners". In 1994, she played Zena in the film Scanner Cop.

She has appeared as a guest star in several other television series, including The Golden Girls, Full House, Roswell, So Little Time, Crossing Jordan and CSI: Crime Scene Investigation. Shepard may be best known for her recurring role as the evil pirate queen, Divatox, in the Power Rangers franchise, starting with Turbo: A Power Rangers Movie. During the first half of the Power Rangers Turbo season, Shepard was replaced by actress Carol Hoyt in the role of Divatox while she was on maternity leave.

In 1996, she portrayed two characters on Star Trek: Deep Space Nine: the Benzite ensign Hoya in “The Ship” and the genetically enhanced Lauren in "Statistical Probabilities" and "Chrysalis". Her 1996 film, Theodore Rex starring Whoopi Goldberg, was originally intended for theatrical release; the film went direct-to-video, and consequently became the most expensive direct-to-video film ever made at the time of its release.

In 1998, she starred in the TV movie Addams Family Reunion, alongside Tim Curry, Daryl Hannah, Haylie Duff and Ed Begley Jr. Only released on VHS and LaserDisc, the film has never been released on DVD.

Shepard portrayed the lead villain, the chain-smoking Virginia Svelte, in Jurgen Vsych's 2001 film Ophelia Learns to Swim.

In 2017, she was cast in the short film The Order, alongside other former Power Rangers cast members.

In 2018, she acted in the Netflix musical film Paradox, the directorial debut of her friend, actress Daryl Hannah.

== Others ==
Shepard and actress Daryl Hannah co-created two board games, "Love It or Hate It" and "LIEbrary," the latter having been previewed by Hannah on The Ellen DeGeneres Show in December 2005.

== Filmography ==
=== Film ===
Year	Title	Role	Notes
1982	Soup for One	Girl #4	
1982	Summer Lovers	Camp Fire Girl	
1984	Weekend Pass	Cindy Hazard	
1985	Radioactive Dreams	Biker Leader	
1985	Private Resort	Shirley	
1986	Tough Guys	Sandy	
1987	Hunk	Alexis Cash	
1988	Lucky Stiff	Cissy	
1989	Troop Beverly Hills	Salesgirl	
1990	Peacemaker	Dori Caisson	
1992	I Don't Buy Kisses Anymore	Ada Fishbine	
1993	Attack of the 50 Ft. Woman	Nurse	TV movie
1994	Scanner Cop	Zena	Video
1996	Theodore Rex	Sarah Jiminez	
1996	Last Exit to Earth	Lilith	TV movie
1997	Turbo: A Power Rangers Movie	Divatox	
1998	Addams Family Reunion	Katherine Adams	
1999	Avalanche	Annie	
2001	A Woman's a Helluva Thing	Melanie	
2001	Ophelia Learns to Swim	Virginia Svelte	
2005	The 40-Year-Old Virgin	Bar Girl	
2005	Going Shopping	Shopper	
2016	The Wrong Roommate	Louise	TV movie
2016	The Order	Helena	Short
2016	666: Teen Warlock	Rogers	TV movie
2016	A Husband for Christmas	Natasha Tate	TV movie
2018	Paradox	Lady	
2018	The Wrong Friend	Mrs. Andrews	TV movie
2018	The Wrong Teacher	Mrs. Peterson	TV movie
2021	The Wrong Fiancé	Detective Connelly	TV movie
2021	Deceived by My Mother-In-Law	Bridget	TV movie
2021	Mommy's Deadly Con Artist	Bridget	TV movie

=== Television ===
Year	Title	Role	Notes
1985	It's Your Move	Meg Robinowitz	Episode: "The Dregs of Humanity: Part 1"
1987	Friday the 13th: The Series	Lady Die/Sarah Berrell	Episode: "A Cup of Time"
1988	Family Ties	Yvette	Episode: "Designing Woman"
1989	Murphy Brown	Jessie	Episode: "It’s How You Play the Game"
1989	The Golden Girls	Yvonne	Episode: "Rites of Spring"
1990	Dream On	Date #2	Episode: "The First Episode"
1990	Doctor Doctor	Rose Hulse	Episode: "Who's Zoomin' Who?"
1991	Princesses	Actress #1	Episode: "Her Highness for Hire"
1992	Full House	Julie Hartman	Episodes: "Radio Days", "Lovers and Other Tanners"
1993	Dark Justice	Helen	Episode: "The Merchant"
1996–98	Star Trek: Deep Space Nine	Hoya/Lauren	Guest Cast: Season 5–7
1997	Power Rangers Turbo	Divatox	Recurring Cast
1998	Power Rangers in Space	Divatox	Recurring Cast
1999	Diagnosis: Murder	Brenda Locke	Episode: "Rescue Me"
1999	Roswell	Nurse Susan	Episode: "Blood Brother"
2000	L.A. 7	Janis	Episode: "Misguided"
2001	So Little Time	Date with Sock Puppet	Episode: "Siblings in the City"
2002	Crossing Jordan	Trudi	Episode: "With Honor"
2002	CSI: Crime Scene Investigation	Mrs. Del Nagro	Episode: "Revenge Is Best Served Cold"
2023	BRYCE	Tammy Tankthrust	Main Cast
2023	As Luck Would Have It	Meghan David	Episode: "Murder 101"

=== Music videos ===
Year	Artist	Song	Role
1995	Meat Loaf	"I'd Lie for You (And That's the Truth)"	Villain
