= Setzer Goes Instru-Mental! =

Studio album by Brian Setzer
- Released: April 19, 2011
- Label: Surfdog
- Producer: Dave Darling, Brian Setzer

Brian Setzer chronology
| 13 (2006) | Setzer Goes Instru-Mental! (2011) | Rockabilly Riot! All Original (2014) |

Setzer Goes Instru-Mental! is a music album by Brian Setzer, released in April 2011 through Surfdog Records. The album earned Setzer a Grammy Award nomination for Best Pop Instrumental Album in 2012. Brian Setzer produced, with Callicore Studio, an animated video, illustrating the song "Go-go Godzilla".

== Track listing ==
All tracks are written by Brian Setzer, except where noted.

| No. | Title | Length |
|---|---|---|
| 1. | "Blue Moon of Kentucky" (Bill Monroe) | 4:18 |
| 2. | "Cherokee" (Ray Noble) | 3:15 |
| 3. | "Be-Bop-A-Lula" (Tex Davis, Gene Vincent) | 4:24 |
| 4. | "Earl's Breakdown" (Earl Scruggs) | 1:53 |
| 5. | "Far Noir East" | 3:44 |
| 6. | "Intermission" | 3:15 |
| 7. | "Go-Go Godzilla" | 3:37 |
| 8. | "Lonesome Road" (Gene Austin, Nathaniel Shilkret) | 2:10 |
| 9. | "Hillbilly Jazz Meltdown" | 2:39 |
| 10. | "Hot Love" | 2:51 |
| 11. | "Pickpocket" | 2:33 |

== Personnel ==
- Brian Setzer - guitar
- John Hatton - double bass
- Noah Levy - drums
