= Eric M. Fowler =

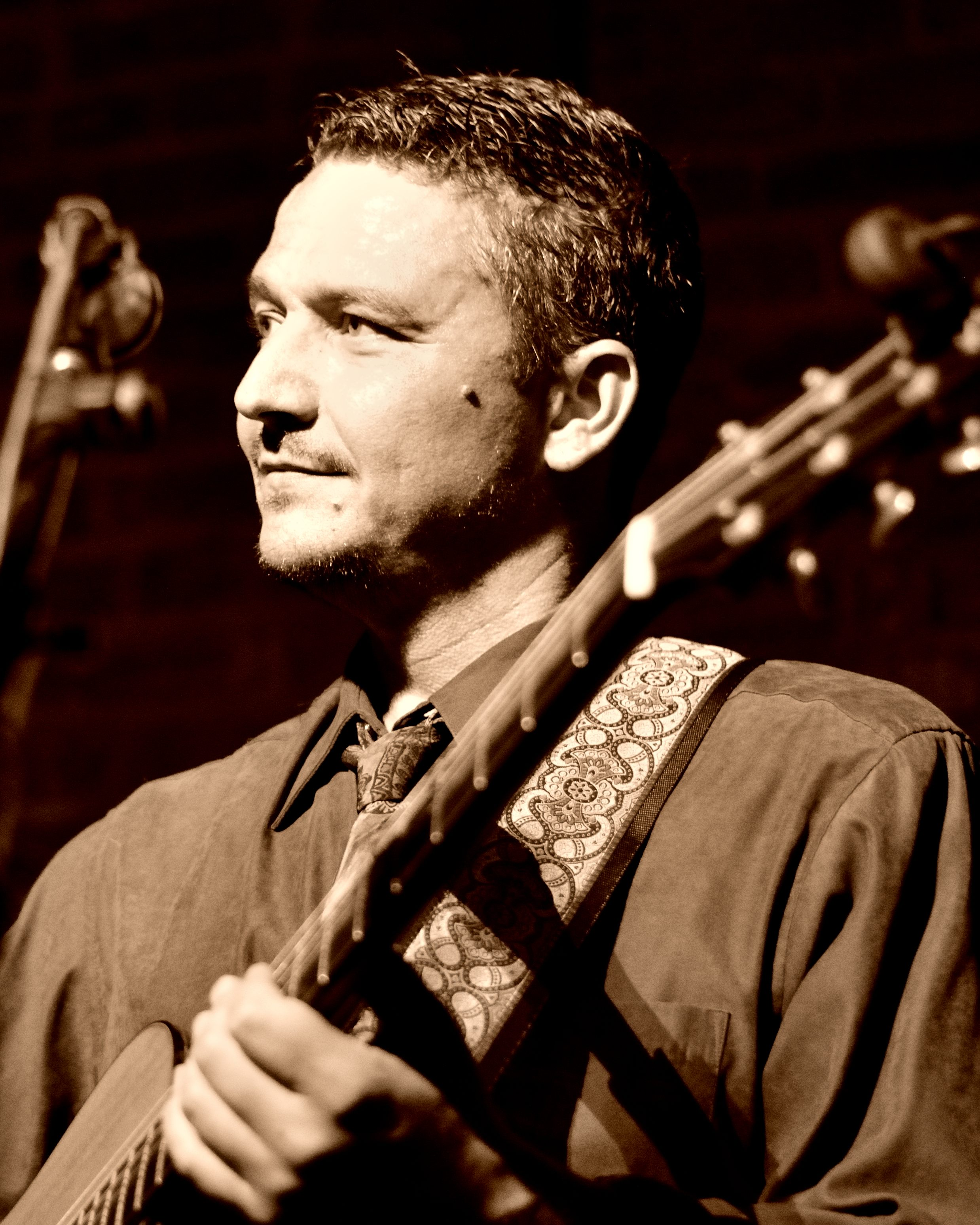
- Eric M. Fowler performing live at WitZend in Venice CA, Sept. 22, 2014

Background information
- Born: Eric M. Fowler; March 2, 1968 (age 58)
- Origin: Pittsfield, MA
- Instruments: Guitar, Bass, Voice, Piano
- Years active: 20

Eric M. Fowler is an American guitarist, singer, songwriter, composer and producer who is best known as a member of musical group Boxing Gandhis. Fowler is a featured musician on many popular recordings by artists such as Sting, UB40, Rosanne Cash, Taylor Dayne, General Public, Clint Black, Kelly Price and the Boxing Gandhis. He currently resides in Los Angeles California with his wife Colette and 3 children.

== Early life ==
Fowler was born in Pittsfield, Massachusetts. his mother Francis is first cousins with Alice Brock (Alice's Restaurant) https://en.wikipedia.org/wiki/Alice_Brock and his maternal grandmothers first cousin was Sen. Margaret Chase Smith of Maine who famously denounced Sen. McCarthy during 1950 a brave "Declaration of Conscience" speech on the Senate floor. https://en.wikipedia.org/wiki/Margaret_Chase_Smith The family moved to Carpinteria, California and returned to Lenox, Massachusetts a year and half later. Fowler performed in local bands throughout the mid-1980s and relocated to 1960s Counterculture Icon Wavy Gravy's Hog Farm in Laytonville, California in 1987. He later migrated to Los Angeles, CA where he attended the Musicians Institute in Hollywood, CA and shortly after became a studio assistant to John Barnes Sr., Fowler later joined the reconstituted British reggae ska group General Public appearing on the live recording of the international hit song "Save it for later" which became the B side to the hit single remake of "I'll take you there" and was featured in the film "Threesome" that same year. During this time Fowler teamed up with well-known producer Andrew Growcott aka "Stoker" (drummer for Dexis Midnight Runners) and through this relationship was a featured guitarist on several hit songs with artists such as Sting, UB40, Rosanne Cash, Taylor Dayne, General Public, Clint Black, Kelly Price. Fowler left General Public to join Boxing Gandhis in support of their top 10 AAA hit self-titled debut album released on Mesa Blue Moon / Atlantic and which featured the hit single "If you Love Me Why am I dying". The video for this song won Billboard Magazine award for Best Jazz Music Video which was odd since the band was an acoustic soul band reminiscent of Sly and the Family Stone, Little Feat and War. Boxing Gandhis were the opening act for The Dave Matthews Band during the "Under the Table and Dreaming" album tour. After the tour the band was signed to Atlantic Records and secured a publishing deal with EMI Music Publishing in advance of the release of their 2nd Album Howard which was released on Atlantic Records. The band embarked on a 2nd tour as opening act for The Dave Matthews Band in support of this 2nd album and released a 3rd record several years later. The band is still actively recording and touring. Fowler continues to compose and produce music for film and television as well as for new artists. Fowler and Boxing Gandhis bandmate Ernie Perez started a production company with Dave Matthews Band saxophonist Leroi Moore. The three collaborated on recordings at the famed Dave Matthews Band recording studio "Haunted Hollow" culminating in the release of new albums by several artists including (Samantha Farrell, Melodrome & Art Decade). In 2014 Boxing Gandhis performed at WitZend in Venice, CA and announced that the group was planning to reform and release a new album with original members Dave Darling, Brie Darling, Ernie Perez, Alfredo Ballesteros, Ted Zig Zag Andreadis.

Currently Eric and wife Colette run a non profit www.huethemuse.org facilitating K-12 music, sound energy healing and mindfulness enrichment programs aimed at raising awareness for planet issues, combatting youth Eco anxiety and promoting collective consciousness concepts around global change initiatives.

Fowler continues to perform, compose and produce music for projects most recently contributing guitar for a Roger Daltrey benefit project featuring The Specials. Collaborated with Steve Ferrone (Tom Petty; Duran Duran, Chaka Khan) on new original music for the debut Hue the Muse commercial music release.

== Discography ==
- Sting – This Cowboy Song – Greatest Hits and Single – (Stoker Remix) - (A&M) Guitarist - RIAA Gold Certified
- UB40 - Baby Come Back - Virgin- Guitar - RIAA Platinum Certified
- George Clinton – Cosmic Slop - Guitar
- Pato Banton – Baby Come Back - Virgin - Guitar - RIAA Platinum Certified
- General Public – Save it for later (Live Recording) B Side Single to – (Sony) – I'll Take You There - Guitar, vocals
- Taylor Dayne – Wind Cries Mary - Searching for Jimi Hendrix Tribute (Capitol Records) - Guitar
- Clint Black – A Bad Goodbye – RCA – Larry Sanders Show (Garry Shandling) - Guitar
- Rosanne Cash – Manic Depression – Searching for Jimi Hendrix Tribute (Capitol Records) - Guitar
- Kelly Price – While you were gone - Epic / Sony Music Soundtrack - Guitar
- MFBird – Cooler – (Positone) - Guitar
- Leah Andreone – Alchemy – (RCA) - Vocals
- Pau Hana – Pau Hana - guitars
- Boxing Gandhis – Howard - Atlantic Records – Guitar, Vocalist, Songwriter
- Boxing Gandhis – Mesa Blue Moon – Guitar, Vocalist, Songwriter
- Boxing Gandhis – 3rd 2nd Chance – Guitar, Vocalist, Songwriter
- Horace Godwink – Thrift Shop - Producer, Songwriter, Guitar, Keyboards, Bass, Vocals
- Horace Godwink – Afterglow - Producer, Songwriter, Guitar, Keyboards, Bass, Vocals

== Television/Video/Web Credits ==
- NBC – Providence – Producer, Guitar, Vocalist, Songwriter
- ABC – Brothers & Sisters - Producer, Guitar, Vocalist, Songwriter
- Fox Sports - Super Bowl Pregame Show - Musician
- HBO - Garry Shandling Show - Guitarist
- HBO – Cosmic Slop – Guitarist
- Boxing Gandhis music video - Mesa Blue Moon - If you love me why am I dying
- Jerry Lewis Telethon – Guest artist with Rebecca Carlish
- PajamasTV - Consultant

== Film Credits ==
- Anchorman 2 - Paramount Pictures - Vocals, Bass Guitar
- Blue Streak - Columbia Pictures - Guitar
- Conflict of Interest - HBO Films - Production Asst.
- Brady Bunch the Movie -
- Threesome – TriStar - Guitarist

== Producer Credits ==
- Art Decade
- Channel
- Roerer Music
- Horace Godwink
- Boxing Gandhis
- Samantha Farrell

== Commercial Credits ==
- Burger King – Manthem – Vocalist – (90 Sec) – Crispin Porter
- Burger King – Anniversary Gift - Shroom n Swiss – Vocalist - (60 Sec) - Crispin Porter
- Burger King – Crashed Car – Shroom n Swiss – Vocalist - (30 Sec) - Crispin Porter
- Burger King – New Tattoo – Shroom n Swiss - Vocalist - (30 Sec) - Crispin Porter
- Burger King – Smore's – Vocalist – Crispin Porter
- McDonald's – Value Meal – Producer/Guitarist
- FedEx – Bus out to the country – Guitarist - BBDO
- Zocor
- Helio - Googlemaps
- Toyota
- Bud Light – Rock Paper Scissors

== Live / Touring ==
- General Public – World Tour
- Carole King
- Dave Matthews Band
- Boxing Gandhis - World Tour
- Horace Godwink – World Tour
- Hootie and the Blowfish
- Big Head Todd and the Monsters
- CC Deville
- Richie Kotzen
- Carrie Hamilton
- Hot Tuna
- Bectones
- MFBird
- The Gathering
- Fade2Black
- Stevie B.
- The Fabulous Grunts of Pleasure
- Street Legal
- Fishbone
- Untouchables
- Jimmy Buffett
- Alex Ligertwood
- Steve Ferrone
