= Statistical Probabilities =

- Star Trek: Deep Space Nine episode
- Episode no.: Season 6 Episode 9
- Directed by: Anson Williams
- Story by: Pam Pietroforte
- Teleplay by: René Echevarria
- Cinematography by: Jonathan West
- Production code: 533
- Original air date: November 24, 1997

Guest appearances
- Jeffrey Combs as Weyoun; Tim Ransom as Jack; Jeannetta Arnette as Dr. Loews; Hilary Shepard as Lauren; Michael Keenan as Patrick; Casey Biggs as Damar; Faith Salie as Sarina Douglas

Episode chronology
← Previous "Resurrection"	Next → "The Magnificent Ferengi"
- Star Trek: Deep Space Nine season 6

"Statistical Probabilities" is the 133rd episode of the syndicated American science fiction television series Star Trek: Deep Space Nine, the ninth episode of the sixth season.

Set in the 24th century, the series follows the adventures on Deep Space Nine, a space station located near a stable wormhole between the Alpha and Gamma quadrants of the Milky Way Galaxy. This episode is part of the Dominion War storyline, in which the United Federation of Planets is at war with the Dominion, an aggressive empire from the Gamma Quadrant, which has already absorbed the nearby planet of Cardassia.

In this episode, the genetically engineered Dr. Julian Bashir works with a group of genetically engineered, socially maladjusted savants to try to help them become productive members of society. Meanwhile, Deep Space Nine hosts peace negotiations with the Dominion.

This episode guest stars Jeannetta Arnette as Dr. Loews, Tim Ransom as Jack, Hilary Shepard as Lauren, Michael Keenan as Patrick and Faith Salie as Sarina Douglas, with Casey Biggs and Jeffrey Combs reprising their recurring roles as Cardassian leader Damar and Dominion representative Weyoun.

== Background ==
In the Star Trek science fiction universe, after genetically engineered "supermen" tried to take over Earth, it remains illegal for parents to genetically engineer their children. The episode "Doctor Bashir, I Presume" in Deep Space Nine's fifth season revealed that the parents of Dr. Bashir, chief medical officer on Deep Space Nine, had him illegally genetically re-engineered as a child to improve his mental and physical abilities. When Bashir's secret was uncovered, his parents cut a deal for him to be allowed to retain his position as a physician and in Starfleet - both career paths from which genetically augmented individuals are normally banned.

== Plot ==
Dr. Bashir has volunteered to help treat four genetically augmented individuals who, due to unintended neurological side effects of their augmentation, are unable to function in society: hyperactive, paranoid Jack; hypersexual Lauren; childlike Patrick; and silent Sarina. Bashir realizes that their primary problem is boredom: as Jack points out, they are forbidden from pursuing any profession where they could put their enhanced brain power to work.

Meanwhile, Damar, the new leader of Cardassia, proposes peace talks with the Federation. Watching his speech, the augments make several accurate guesses about Damar and how he came to power. Bashir convinces Captain Sisko to allow the augments to review the peace negotiations to see if they can determine the Dominion's agenda.

Based on subtle clues in Damar and Weyoun's speech and behavior, the augments deduce that the Dominion wants to draw the border to secure a planet that has the raw materials needed to make ketracel white, the drug used to control the Dominion's Jem'Hadar soldiers. Knowing this gives the Federation negotiators a huge advantage in the talks.

Starfleet provides the augments with further intelligence in order to develop a statistical model to predict the future. The augments soon come to the conclusion that the Federation is doomed to lose the war and suffer casualties in the hundreds of billions. As a result, they recommend surrender, which will save those lives and still leave the Federation in a position to rise up against the Dominion in the future. Bashir is convinced the augments are right and argues the case before Sisko. However, Sisko and Starfleet reject the suggestion out of hand.

The augments decide to leak Starfleet's strategic plans to the Dominion, hoping to shorten the war and minimize the casualties. When Bashir objects to this treasonous plan, Jack, Lauren, and Patrick overpower him. Bound hand and foot, and left alone with Sarina, Bashir convinces her that her fellow augments' actions will result in their imprisonment and separation. Sarina frees Bashir in the nick of time, and Bashir intercepts the augments on their way to the meeting with the Dominion negotiators.

Bashir realizes that the augments believed they couldn't possibly be wrong because of their superior intellect; but despite the presumed infallibility of their statistical model, the actions of one person (Sarina) completely altered history. The augments return to their institution, promising to continue work on a plan for defeating the Dominion.

== Production ==
Writer Bradley Thompson explained that the idea of predicting the future using advanced statistical models was based on a concept known as "psychohistory" from the Foundation novels by Isaac Asimov.

The episode was directed by Anson Williams, best known for his role as Potsie from Happy Days. He previously directed the Star Trek: Voyager episode "Real Life".

Sarina, played by Faith Salie, has no spoken lines in this episode; some lines had been scripted for her, but they were cut from the episode for time. She and the other actors playing the four augments would go on to reprise their characters in the later episode "Chrysalis", but Salie would have to re-audition for the role.

Hilary Shepard Turner previously appeared as a Benzite in the Season 5 episode "The Ship".

== Reception ==
Keith DeCandido of Tor.com rated the episode seven out of ten.

In 2011, this episode was noted by Forbes as one of the top ten episodes of the franchise that explores the implications of advanced technology, in the case genetic manipulation. They praised the episode for exploring the tragic implications for technological enhancement gone wrong. Forbes also suggested the episode "The Masterpiece Society" for its exploration of a genetically engineered society encountered by the Enterprise-D. The article notes that one reason the Federation banned genetic augmentation was because of the Eugenics Wars, in the Star Trek timeline. They tied the exploration of Bashir's character, the Star Trek story and the other augmented characters under a concept that, despite the promises of a technology's benefit, things can go wrong.
