= American Girls (band) =

American all-female band

American Girls were an American all-female band based in California, United States.

American Girls originally started as a film project, which fizzled. After some personnel changes and more rehearsing, the band sustained many comparisons to the Go-Go's, who were popular at the time as well assigned to the same label, IRS Records. However, American Girls featured veterans of the all-women band scene including Brie Howard who had played drums for Fanny and Miiko Watanabe who played bass with the Screamin' Sirens. They recorded one album only, which was intended as a demo but was pressed to vinyl in its original form. The eponymous debut album was released in March 1986. The cover shows the band in a hotel room, with alcohol, a deck of cards, and a copy of The National Enquirer.

The video for their single "American Girl" received some airplay on MTV.

Their song "Androgynous" appeared in the 1986 film Tough Guys and the song "American Girl" appeared on the soundtrack for Out of Bounds. They also opened for The Lords of the New Church on 1986 tour dates.

Miles Copeland III (brother of the Police's Stewart Copeland) was the band's manager.

== Personnel ==
=== Members ===
- Brie Howard: lead Vocals, LinnDrum programming, drums, percussion
- Hilary Shepard: lead vocals, percussion
- DB Tressler: guitars
- Miiko Watanabe: bass, backing vocals
- Teresa James: keyboards, backing vocals

=== Early members ===
- Louise Goffin: rhythm guitar, lead, and backing vocals
- Daryl Hannah: keyboards

== See also ==
- List of all-women bands
