= Alien Fashion Show =

American band

- Origin: Los Angeles, California
- Genres: swing; lounge; alternative rock; rockabilly
- Years active: 1998-1999, 2011, 2019
- Labels: Surfdog; Hollywood
- Past members: Eldon Daetweiler; Jeff Daetweiler; Todd Thurman; Jeffrey Allen; Kenji Saito; Steve "Shaman" Steinberg
- Website: www.alienfashionshow.com

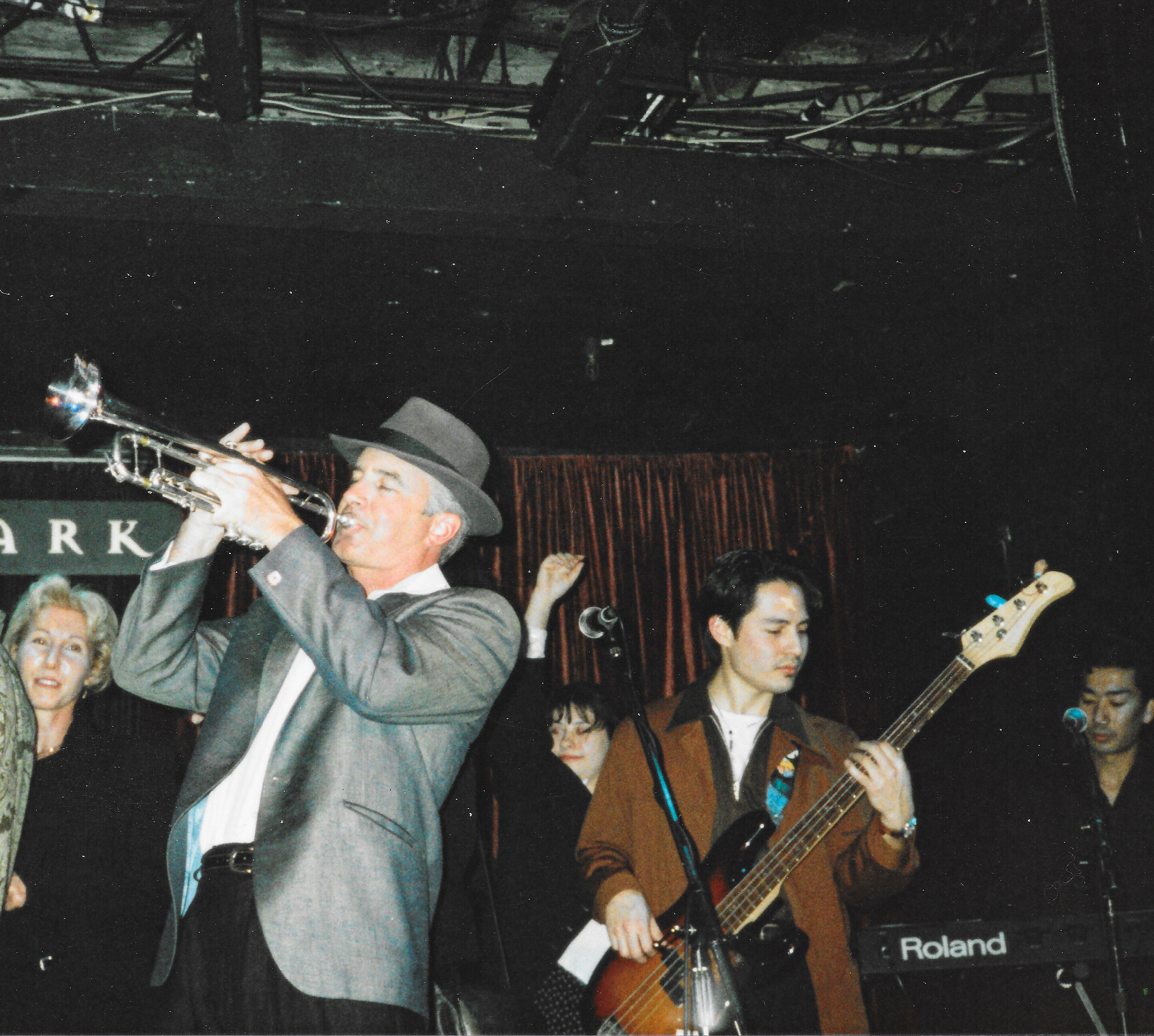
Alien Fashion Show gig at Luna Park in Santa Monica, California 1997. Pictured are Eldon, Steve (bass) and Kenji

Alien Fashion Show is an American swing revival band, formed in Los Angeles in 1996. After being invited to perform as Brian Setzer's opening act during his Fall 1998 tour, the group signed to Surfdog, then Hollywood Records, and released their eponymous debut album in 1998. Also in 1998, the group drew attention when "Detroit Swing City" became the first-ever song to be released by a major record label as a free MP3 download. Reaction to this new method was generally mixed, but both the group and the label defended the approach, and other labels began adopting the release medium as well.

The group's music went into rotation on multiple alternative and college radio stations around the United States, and they toured through 1999. In 2011, they self-released their second studio album, Cool Thing, and in 2019 released an EP titled Hellsville. Their work was also featured on multiple labels' swing revival compilations in the late 1990s.

== History ==
The group was formed in Los Angeles in 1996 by Eldon Daetweiler, a singer and trumpeter; Daetweiler's brother Jeff, a drummer; Todd Thurman, a guitarist; Jeffrey Allen, a bassist and childhood friend of the Daetweilers; Steve "Shaman" Steinberg, original bassist, and Kenji "Woodchuck" Saito, a keyboardist. The Daetweilers had listened to music by Frank Sinatra, Jimmy Dorsey, and Glenn Miller as children, and been inspired by them to begin playing the trumpet and drums. Prior to forming the group, all had performed extensively in the LA club scene.

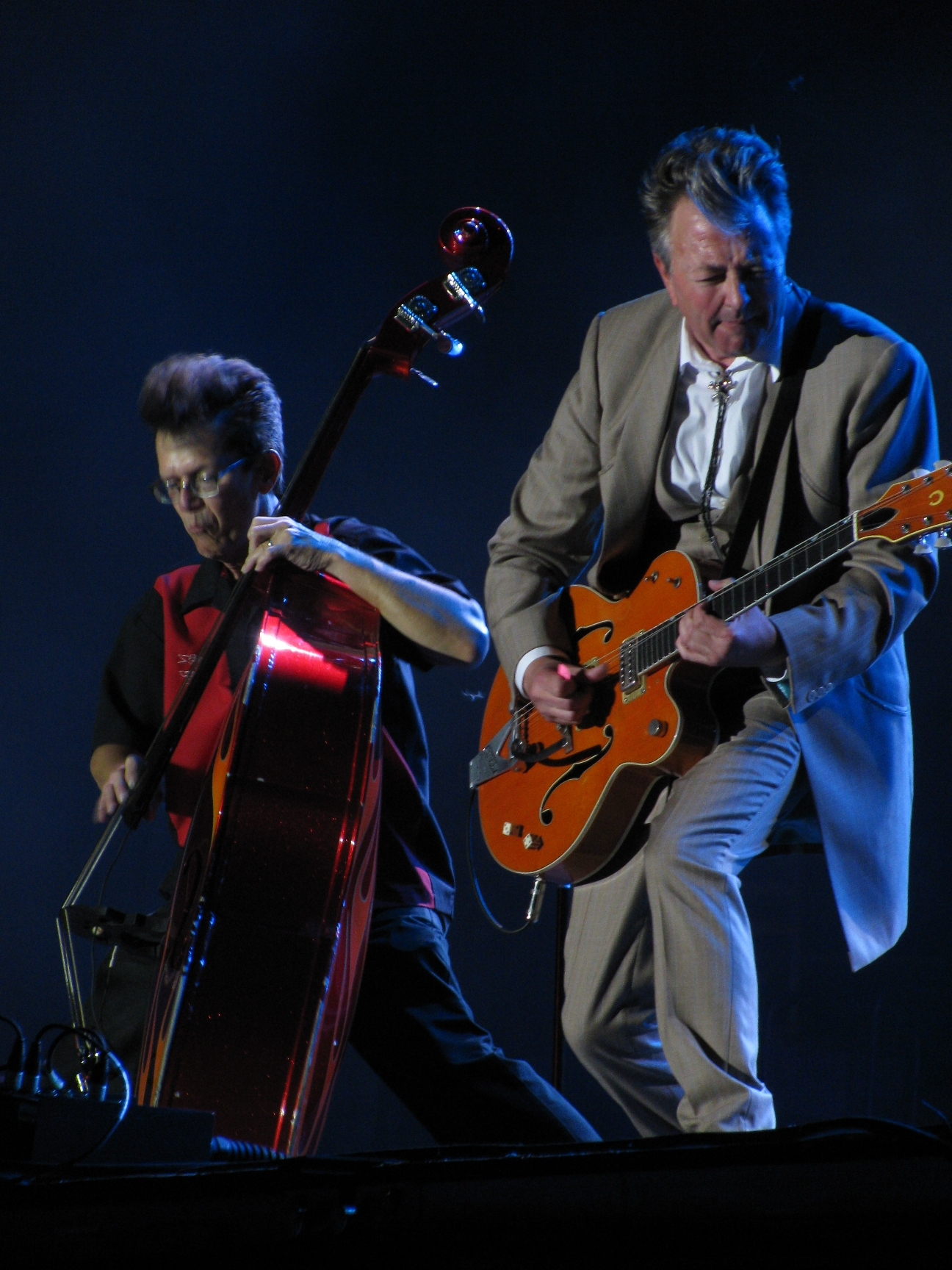
After hearing their music, rockabilly musician Brian Setzer (above) invited the group to be the opening act on his 1998 tour.

Rockabilly and swing revival musician Brian Setzer heard some of the group's early recordings and invited them to perform as the opening act for his Fall 1998 tour. Setzer's manager subsequently signed them to Surfdog Records for the release of their debut full-length studio album. They recorded their debut album at two California studios: 4th Street Recording, in Santa Monica, and Village Recorder, in Los Angeles. Their eponymous debut album was released later that year, on July 28, 1998, and re-released by Hollywood Records.

One of the tracks on the debut, "Detroit Swing City", was a swing-styled cover of the Kiss song "Detroit Rock City". On July 23, five days before the release of its parent album, Hollywood Records announced that it would be releasing the track for free online as a downloadable MP3 file. This made "Detroit Swing City" the first-ever song to be released in such a format by a major record label. Executives at the label expressed hope that the song's release would help to spread the band's name and boost sales of the album and concert tickets, especially given that they had no intention of formally releasing the song as a commercial single. The group shared these expectations, with Jeff Daetweiler arguing that "if they hear the single, people will hopefully buy the album. I think it has been a boon for us, really, rather than a hindrance. And I hope the rest of the industry starts to realize that." Hollywood Records' General Manager told Billboard at the end of 1998 that this decision drew criticism from some who were skeptical of the new format; however, in the following months, other major-label artists also began releasing their music as free MP3 files. The song had been downloaded more than 40,000 times by the summer of 1999.

By February 1999, the group was also in rotation on some American college radio and alternative rock stations, including Maryville, Missouri's KDLX; Fort Lauderdale, Florida's WNSU; Jacksonville, Florida's WFIN; Rochester, New York's WIRQ; Sanborn, New York's WNCB; and St. Louis's KNSX. In 1999, the group performed with rock bands including the Goo Goo Dolls, and co-headlined the 25-date Freschetta Mirror Ball Tour in Spring of that year.

The group reunited in 2011 to release Cool Thing, a studio album consisting of re-recorded tracks from their 1998 debut in addition to some new material. In 2019, the group released an extended play, titled Hellsville; it was recorded at 4th Street Recording, the same Santa Monica studio at which they had recorded part of their debut album.

=== Musical style ===
Lead singer Eldon Daetweiler has stated that the group did not aim to be a "quote swing band", and that their objective was instead to imagine "What if Frank Sinatra grew up in the town of Twin Peaks or hung out with David Bowie?" Although classified as a swing band, the group has also been noted for the many other stylistic influences which they incorporate into their music, including surf, rockabilly, and trip-hop.

== Discography ==
- Alien Fashion Show (Compose Records, 1997)
- Alien Fashion Show (Surfdog/Hollywood, 1998)
- Cool Thing (Babsboys Music, 2011)

== Works cited ==
- Ankeny, Jason. "Biography: Alien Fashion Show". Allmusic. RhythmOne.
- Nelson, Chris (July 27, 1998). "Hollywood Records Dives into Controversial MP3 Format". MTV. Archived from the original on May 10, 2021.
- Pener, Degen (2009). The Swing Book. New York: Hachette. ISBN 978-0316076678.
- Reece, Doug (December 26, 1998). "Labels Striving for Security in the Digital Future — Industry Hesitant with MP3s". Billboard. Vol. 110, no. 52. pp. 5, 84.
- Reece, Doug (January 9, 1999). "Online Ventures Met Real World in '98". Billboard. Vol. 111, no. 2. pp. 43–44.
- Rosenberg, Leslie (Summer 1999). "Swingin into the Space Age: Alien Fashion Show". Atomic. 1 (2): 9–12.
