= Music for Our Mother Ocean =

Compilation album trilogy produced by Surfdog Records

MOM: Music for Our Mother Ocean
- Cover of the first volume in the series

Compilation album by the Surfrider Foundation
- Released: Vol. 1: July 2, 1996; Vol. 2: August 26, 1997; Vol. 3: August 10, 1999
- Label: Surfdog, Interscope, Hollywood
- Producer: Dave Kaplan, Pierce Flynn

MOM: Music for Our Mother Ocean is a compilation album trilogy produced by Surfdog Records to benefit the Surfrider Foundation. The albums feature original songs as well as covers – many sharing a surfing or summer theme – by a range of popular artists.

== Reception ==
Entertainment Weekly's Mike Flaherty gave Volume 1 a "B" rating. He called the compilation less sanctimonious than traditional benefit albums, noting the number of celebrity artists, and he singled-out Pearl Jam's cover of the "loopy" "Gremmie Out of Control" and Helmet's "ham-fisted" cover of "Army of Me". Marcus Greville of the Green Left Weekly stated that due to the inconsistent song styles the album was "appealing, but difficult to become engaged in". He gave the album 7/10, and recommended the album as a "gift for a surfer friend". David Yonke of the Toledo Blade called it "one of the most enjoyable compilation albums to be issued in a while", but noted that the "MOM" abbreviation should have been "MOMO".

Volume 2 received a "B−" from Entertainment Weekly's Steven Mirkin. He preferred the "freshness" of ska bands like 311 and Mighty Mighty Bosstones to the more surf rock-inspired tracks, calling the Beach Boys' "Summer in Paradise" "especially tired". He commended Dick Dale's "Misirlou '97" as being the only track to successfully bridge the old and new styles, and called Jewel's "V-12 Cadillac" "a loser, ecologically and musically."

In his review of Volume 3, Steve Crawford of the Houston Chronicle called the series both a "terrific product" due to the disparate musicians working to help the environment, and "tepid bathwater" due to many "halfhearted" tracks. He called the covers of "Little Deuce Coupe" from Brian Setzer, "Here Comes the Sun" from Allison Moorer and "Summer in the City" from the Butthole Surfers as "tame and routine". He viewed some songs more favorably, calling Everclear's "Walk, Don't Run" "rip-roaring", and Sprung Monkey's "Coconut" "clever and bouncy". AllMusic's Stephen Thomas Erlewine gave the Surfrider Foundation credit for compiling exclusive "first-rate" tracks performed by major artists, but called the result a balance "between the good and the mediocre". He was the most positive about the "frazzled beach party song" "Electric Music and the Summer People" by Beck, the "strangely ambitious" "The Whale Song" from Pearl Jam, and the collaboration between Snoop Dogg and Rage Against the Machine, "Snoop Bounce". Also mentioned favorably were "Little Deuce Coupe" from Brian Setzer and Brian Wilson, "Walk, Don't Run" from Everclear, "Winter Waves" from Chris Isaak, and the "fun punk throwaway" of the Beastie Boys' "Nothing to Say". Sprung Monkey's "Coconut" was mentioned as one of the few "trying moments", and he did point out that tracks from Paul McCartney and James Taylor had been previously released, but felt "the good intentions outweigh the end result". Ultimately, he felt that the varied nature of the tracks would prevent listeners from enjoying the entire album, but that it was still more enjoyable than typical benefit albums.

== Track listings ==
MOM: Music for Our Mother Ocean (1996)
No.	Title	Writer(s)	Performer	Length
1.	"Intro: Ancient Dolphin Dance"		Chumash people	0:18
2.	"Good Times"	Steve Summers, Mike Summers, William Riley, Tony Delocht, Ernie Longoria	Sprung Monkey	2:56
3.	"Gremmie Out of Control" (originally performed by The Silly Surfers)	Jimmie Haskell, Gary Usher	Pearl Jam	2:24
4.	"Honky Tonk" (originally performed Bill Doggett)	Billy Butler, Shep Shepherd, Bill Doggett, Clifford Scott	The Brian Setzer Orchestra	4:29
5.	"California Sun" (originally performed by Joe Jones)	Henry Glover, Morris Levy	Ramones	1:47
6.	"Bali Eyes" (from Good God's Urge, 1996)	Perry Farrell, Stephen Perkins, Peter DiStefano, Martyn LeNoble	Porno for Pyros	3:26
7.	"Surfin' U.S.A." (originally performed by The Beach Boys)	Chuck Berry, Brian Wilson	Pennywise	1:44
8.	"Surfin' Bird" (originally performed by The Trashmen)	Turner Wilson, John Harris, Carl White, Alfred Frazier	Silverchair	2:20
9.	"Wipe Out" (originally performed by The Surfaris)	Bob Berryhill, Pat Connolly, Ron Wilson, Jim Fuller	Gary Hoey with Donavon Frankenreiter	3:30
10.	"Never Give Up" (from Psychedelic Surf Groove, 1996)	Jai Vatuk	Common Sense	4:17
11.	"I Can't Surf" (from Liquor in the Front, 1994)	Jim Heath, Jimbo Wallace, Taz Bentley	Reverend Horton Heat	2:40
12.	"Mama Nature"	Pato Banton, Stephen Morrison	Pato Banton and the Reggae Revolution	4:28
13.	"Mr. Know It All" (live)	Les Claypool, Larry LaLonde, Tim Alexander	Primus	4:23
14.	"Sailin' On" (originally performed by Bad Brains)	Darryl Jenifer, Dr. Know	No Doubt	3:35
15.	"Army of Me" (originally performed by Björk)	Björk, Graham Massey	Helmet	4:28
16.	"My Wave" (from Superunknown, 1994)	Chris Cornell, Kim Thayil	Soundgarden	5:12
17.	"Quiet Warrior"	Jewel	Jewel	4:07
18.	"Hateful"	Art Alexakis, Craig Montoya, Greg Eklund	Everclear	1:36
19.	"Blackwing"	Jason Ross, Jason Pollock	Seven Mary Three	3:47
20.	"Netty's Girl" (from "Pass the Mic", 1992)	Mike D, Ad-Rock, Adam Yauch, Money Mark	Beastie Boys	3:28
21.	"Badfish" (from 40oz. to Freedom, 1992)	Bradley Nowell	Sublime	3:05
22.	"Waggy" (from They Came to Conquer... Uranus, 1995)	Mark Hoppus, Tom DeLonge, Scott Raynor	Blink-182	2:54
23.	"Closing: Mahalo Ke Akua"		Mikaele Opio	1:23

MOM II: Music for Our Mother Ocean (1997)
No.	Title	Writer(s)	Performer	Length
1.	"Intro"	Dick Dale, Pierce Flynn	Dick Dale with Pato Banton	0:30
2.	"Misirlou '97"	Nicholas Roubanis	Dick Dale and Gary Hoey	3:02
3.	"I Get Around" (originally performed by The Beach Boys)	Brian Wilson, Mike Love	Pennywise	1:56
4.	"Atta Girl"	Steve Summers, Mike Summers, William Riley, Tony Delocht, Ernie Longoria	Sprung Monkey	2:18
5.	"V-12 Cadillac"	Denny Aaberg, Ernest Knapp	Jewel	3:26
6.	"Ocean" (originally performed by The Pietasters)	Todd Eckhardt, Tom Goodin, Steve Jackson	The Mighty Mighty Bosstones with The Pietasters	3:36
7.	"Fly Juice"	Brian Setzer	The Brian Setzer Orchestra	3:38
8.	"Tonight" (cover version of song from West Side Story)	Leonard Bernstein, Stephen Sondheim	Porno for Pyros	3:37
9.	"Hydroponic" (from Music, 1993)	Chad Sexton, Nick Hexum, Doug Martinez	311	3:55
10.	"Barflies at the Beach" (based on "Sing, Sing, Sing (With a Swing)" by Louis Prima)	Eddie Nichols, Louis Prima	Royal Crown Revue	3:01
11.	"Paddle Out" (from Sublime, 1996)	Bradley Nowell, Eric Wilson, Bud Gaugh	Sublime	1:15
12.	"The Other Side of the World"	J. R. Richards, Rodney Browning Cravens, Scot Alexander, George Pendergast, Jim Wood	Dishwalla	3:45
13.	"Acid"	Glen Phillips, Todd Nichols, Dean Dinning, Randy Guss	Toad the Wet Sprocket	3:57
14.	"Get It Right" (from Ignition, 1992)	Dexter Holland, Noodles, Greg Kriesel, Ron Welty	The Offspring	3:05
15.	"Excuse Me Mr." (from Fight for Your Mind, 1995)	Ben Harper, J.P. Plunier	Ben Harper	5:24
16.	"Angels of the Silences" (from Recovering the Satellites, 1996)	Adam Duritz, Charlie Gillingham, David Bryson, Matt Malley, Ben Mize, Dan Vickrey	Counting Crows	3:38
17.	"Trouble on the Horizon"	Jimmy Buffett	Jimmy Buffett	6:33
18.	"Summer in Paradise" (live June 29, 1993, at Wembley Arena)	Mike Love, Terry Melcher, Craig Fall	The Beach Boys	4:21
19.	"The Blue Light of the Underwater Sun" (from "Everytime You Touch Me", 1995)	Moby	Moby	4:19
20.	"Ocean Warriors"	Pato Banton, Pierce Flynn, Dave Kaplan	Pato Banton	3:56
21.	"Giver Man"	Donavon Frankenreiter, Sunchild	Sunchild	4:27
22.	"Closing"	Dick Dale	Dick Dale	0:47

MOM 3 (1999)
No.	Title	Writer(s)	Performer	Length
1.	"Little Deuce Coupe" (originally performed by The Beach Boys)	Roger Christian, Brian Wilson	Brian Setzer with Brian Wilson	2:35
2.	"Coconut" (originally performed by Harry Nilsson)	Harry Nilsson	Sprung Monkey	3:25
3.	"Summer in the City" (originally performed by The Lovin' Spoonful)	Steve Boone, John Sebastian, Mark Sebastian	Butthole Surfers	3:13
4.	"Electric Music and the Summer People" (from "Cold Brains", 1999)	Beck	Beck	3:34
5.	"Snoop Bounce"	Snoop Dogg, Tom Morello, Tim Commerford, Brad Wilk	Snoop Dogg with members of Rage Against the Machine	6:04
6.	"Summer"	Lisa Loeb	Lisa Loeb	2:12
7.	"Ocean Size" (Butthole Surfers remix)	Eric Avery, Perry Farrell, Dave Navarro, Stephen Perkins	Jane's Addiction	4:22
8.	"The Whale Song"	Jack Irons	Pearl Jam	3:33
9.	"Here Comes the Sun" (originally performed by The Beatles)	George Harrison	Allison Moorer	3:08
10.	"Wild Life" (from Wild Life, 1971)	Paul McCartney	Paul McCartney and Wings	6:39
11.	"Gone Surfin'" (from Money, 1999)	Gary Hoey	Gary Hoey	3:12
12.	"Sea Cruise" (originally performed by Huey "Piano" Smith; from Margaritaville Cafe: Late Night Gumbo, 1995)	Huey "Piano" Smith	Jimmy Buffett	3:05
13.	"How Strong"	Anthony Kiedis, Flea, John Frusciante, Chad Smith	Red Hot Chili Peppers	4:42
14.	"Walk, Don't Run" (originally performed by Johnny Smith)	Johnny Smith	Everclear	1:59
15.	"Wicked Man" (from "Ground on Down", 1995)	Ben Harper	Ben Harper	5:04
16.	"Mother"	Greg Camp	Smash Mouth	3:06
17.	"Gaia" (from Hourglass, 1997)	James Taylor	James Taylor	5:24
18.	"Nothing to Say"	Mike D, Ad-Rock, Adam Yauch, Amery Smith	Beastie Boys	1:16
19.	"Sunland"	Jeremy Kay	JKay	4:32
20.	"Money"	Jeremy Popoff, A. Jay Popoff	Lit	2:57
21.	"Winter Waves"	Chris Isaak	Chris Isaak	2:46
