= Rockabilly Riot! All Original =

Rockabilly Riot!: All Original

Studio album by Brian Setzer
- Released: August 12, 2014
- Recorded: 2014
- Studio: RCA Studio A, New York City
- Genre: Rockabilly
- Length: 39:51
- Label: Surfdog
- Producer: Peter Collins

Brian Setzer chronology
Setzer Goes Instru-Mental! (2011)	Rockabilly Riot!: All Original (2014)

Professional ratings
Aggregate scores
Source	Rating
Metacritic	72/100
Review scores
Source	Rating
AllMusic	3.5/5 stars
PopMatters	8/10 stars

Rockabilly Riot!: All Original is the ninth solo studio album by American musician Brian Setzer, released on August 12, 2014. The album features 12 new songs, including "Let's Shake", a single released by Setzer earlier in 2014.

== Track listing ==
Rockabilly Riot! All Original track listing
No.	Title	Length
1.	"Let's Shake"	3:30
2.	"Rockabilly Blues"	3:44
3.	"Vinyl Records"	3:22
4.	"Lemme Slide"	2:05
5.	"Nothing Is a Sure Thing"	3:12
6.	"What's Her Name?"	3:37
7.	"Calamity Jane"	3:49
8.	"The Girl with the Blues in Her Eyes"	3:38
9.	"Stiletto Cool"	3:20
10.	"I Should'a Had a V-8"	3:17
11.	"Blue Lights, Big City"	2:08
12.	"Cock-a-doodle Don't"	4:16
Total length:		39:51

== Personnel ==
- Brian Setzer – vocals, guitar
- Mark W. Winchester – bass
- Kevin McKendree – piano
- Noah Levy – drums
- Chris Pelcer – Calliope organ on "Calamity Jane"
- Paul Franklin – pedal steel guitar on "The Girl with the Blues in her Eyes"
- Joey Nardone – backing vocals on "Blue Lights, Big City"

== Charts ==
Chart performance for Rockabilly Riot! All Original
Chart (2014)	Peak position
Belgian Albums (Ultratop Wallonia)	135
Dutch Albums (Album Top 100)	84
Finnish Albums (Suomen virallinen lista)	19
French Albums (SNEP)	175
German Albums (Offizielle Top 100)	56
UK Independent Albums (OCC)	24
US Billboard 200	91
US Independent Albums (Billboard)	14
US Top Rock Albums (Billboard)	24
