= Kyle Maack =

American singer (born 1992)

- Born: Kyle Allen McCarty; March 5, 1992 (age 34)
- Origin: Berlin, New Jersey, U.S.
- Genres: R&B; soul
- Occupations: Singer; producer
- Years active: 2012–present
- Label: 10/30 International

Kyle Allen McCarty (born March 5, 1992), known professionally as Kyle Maack, is an American R&B and soul singer and producer. He is best known for recording with the Temptations and working as a video producer and cast member of WMMR's The Preston & Steve Show.

== Early life and military service ==
Maack was raised in Berlin, New Jersey, and graduated from Eastern Regional High School. He credits hearing his grandmother play the Drifters' recording of "White Christmas", particularly its harmonies and distinctive voices, with introducing him to classic R&B.

Maack enlisted in the United States Air Force in 2012 and was selected as a vocalist for its touring entertainment ensemble, Tops in Blue, in 2014.

== Music career ==
Credited as Kyle Allen, Maack appeared on "Time Is Now" and "Welcome Home Heartache" from Drew Schultz's 2012 album Back to Class. The album also featured the Four Tops, members of the Funk Brothers, Ken Knox of Chairmen of the Board, Dennis Coffey, James Jamerson Jr., Lenny Pickett, Spyder Turner, Melvin Davis and Pat Lewis.

Also credited as Kyle Allen, Maack appeared as a member of the Collective Will on Kamuela Kahoano's single "Hello World" and released "Baby Pick Up" with Catnipp in 2014.

Temptations founder Otis Williams signed Maack to his 10/30 International label after hearing him perform during a 2016 sound check. Maack's 2017 EP Shakey Ground included "Treat Her Like a Lady", featuring the Temptations; "All I Need", featuring Williams and Terry Weeks; and "Here I Am", its only original song, co-written by Maack and Williams.

Dave Darling produced Shakey Ground in 2017 and went on to produce the Temptations' album All the Time the following year.

Shakey Ground received mixed responses. Maack said that longtime Temptations fans were generally more critical of the EP's reinterpretations, while listeners less familiar with the original recordings responded more positively.

In an interview on the band Ju-Taun's Young Lion TV podcast, Maack later said that Williams' touring, promotion of All the Time and publicity for Ain't Too Proud left insufficient time to oversee his career, resulting in Williams offering to release him from his contract. Maack also said that being represented by longtime Temptations manager Shelly Berger while Williams headed the label created a conflict of interest during artist-label negotiations and agreements.

In 2023, Maack independently released the song "Yes", which is currently available only as a music video.

Maack later contributed vocals throughout Edgardo Cintron and the Inca Band's 2024 benefit album For Danny, which presented new recordings of songs by the late singer-songwriter Danny DeGennaro.

== Broadcasting and podcasting ==
Maack interned with The Preston & Steve Show from 2018 to 2019, participating in video and music productions and comedy stunts such as "Kissing Virgins". From 2018 to 2022, he co-hosted the entertainment program TriJam Podcast with Shae Davis, Jo Rivers and Will Wright.

Maack returned to WMMR as videographer for the September 2022 cross-country production "Casey's Big Adventure". His work on the trip led to his hiring as video producer, succeeding Nick Murphy, who had previously trained him.

As a cast member, Maack became a regular contributor to on-air conversations, comedy bits and musical segments while producing the show's broadcasts, livestreams and digital content. He was particularly associated with the jingles for Kathy Romano's Fall Activities and Holiday Activities features, which he continued producing after Romano moved to B101.

In January 2023, Tommy Davidson invited Maack to perform at World Cafe Live after meeting him at WMMR. Maack sang "What You Won't Do for Love" with saxophonist Marcus Mitchell and joined Davidson for "Sweet Thing".

Maack was laid off from WMMR during broader corporate staff reductions in 2024.

== Other works ==
In 2024, Maack and drummer Alvin Burnett co-founded MXM, an 11-piece ensemble presenting Minute by Minute: The Songbook of Michael McDonald. Maack is a producer and lead vocalist for the production, which debuted at the Landis Theater in January 2025. During a December 2024 appearance on The Preston & Steve Show, he jokingly thanked WMMR for "all the free time they gave me to put this show together".

== Discography ==
=== Extended plays ===
- Shakey Ground (2017)

=== Singles ===
- "Hello World" by Kamuela Kahoano featuring the Collective Will (as a member of the Collective Will, 2013)
- "Baby Pick Up" with Catnipp (credited as Kyle Allen, 2014)
- "Treat Her Like a Lady" (featuring the Temptations, 2017)
- "Here I Am" (2017)
- "Yes" (2023)

=== Featured appearances ===
- Drew Schultz – "Time Is Now" (credited as Kyle Allen, 2012)
- Drew Schultz – "Welcome Home Heartache" (credited as Kyle Allen, 2012)
- Inca – "UGOTME" (featuring Kyle Maack, 2019)
- Edgardo Cintron and the Inca Band – For Danny (vocals, 2024)
