= Chrysalis (Star Trek: Deep Space Nine) =

- Star Trek: Deep Space Nine episode
- Episode no.: Season 7 Episode 5
- Directed by: Jonathan West
- Written by: René Echevarria
- Production code: 555
- Original air date: October 26, 1998

Guest appearances
- Tim Ransom as Jack; Faith C. Salie as Sarina Douglas; Hilary Shepard Turner as Lauren; Michael Keenan as Patrick; Aron Eisenberg as Nog

Episode chronology
← Previous "Take Me Out to the Holosuite"	Next → "Treachery, Faith, and the Great River"
- Star Trek: Deep Space Nine season 7

"Chrysalis" is the 155th episode of the television series Star Trek: Deep Space Nine, the fifth episode of the seventh season. The episode was written by Rene Echeverria and directed by Jonathan West.

Set in the 24th century, the series follows the adventures of the crew of the space station Deep Space Nine. This episode revisits the four genetically-enhanced characters introduced in the Season 6 episode “Statistical Probabilities”, whose genetic modifications have given them enhanced intelligence but behavioral abnormalities that make it difficult for them to function in society: aggressive, hyperactive Jack; catatonic Sarina; hypersexual Lauren; and childlike Patrick. In this episode, Deep Space Nine's chief medical officer Julian Bashir, who was himself genetically enhanced without adverse side effects, cures Sarina of her catatonia and begins to fall in love with her.

The episode was first aired the week of October 26, 1998, and received Nielsen ratings of 4.3 points.

== Plot ==
Jack, Lauren, Patrick, and Sarina show up at Deep Space Nine, impersonating an Admiral and his staff, so that Bashir can try to cure Sarina's condition. They help Bashir refine a medical instrument so he can operate on her.

The operation is a success and Sarina is able to speak and interact with her surroundings for the first time. When she's reintroduced to the rest of her group, they try to help her feel included by starting up a sing-along. Though initially only able to sing in monotone, within minutes Sarina masters solfège and is able to improvise an a capella fugue with the others.

The quartet later is discussing the eventual Big Crunch, trying to figure out how to stop it. When Sarina argues against the feasibility of doing so, Jack shuts her down. When Bashir comes in to check on her later, she's drawn within herself, seemingly catatonic as she was before the operation; fearing the worst, he goes over to check on her. She tells him that she resumed this stance to stay out of the discussion, because she had been made to feel Jack and the others expected her to be quiet.

Bashir falls in love with her and assigns another doctor to take over her care so he can pursue her romantically. She is not ready for a relationship, and goes catatonic again after he invites her to his quarters for dinner. After she recovers, she tells him she felt pressured to thank Julian for curing her by being the woman of his dreams. At the end, she leaves DS9 for a scientific internship.

== Casting and production ==
The actors playing Sarina, Jack, Lauren, and Patrick had previously portrayed the same characters earlier in the series. However, Faith Salie, who played Sarina, had to re-audition for the role before being cast in this episode, since in her previous appearance she had had no spoken lines. Although the character would have to sing in the episode, singing was not part of her audition; but Salie was able to harness her previous experience doing musicals in school and theater for this role.

The musical scene took a day of filming at the Paramount lot, and then a separate recording was done to dub the audio. Tim Ransom, as Jack, was unable to sing, and so the character's singing voice was dubbed by a different performer; the other actors dubbed their own voices.

== Reception ==
In their 2003 book Beyond the Final Frontier, Mark Jones and Lance Parkin say that Alexander Siddig and Faith Salie's performances as Bashir and Sarina in this episode give depth to "a pretty unpromising story", and describe the episode as one of the better Star Trek romances.

Keith R. A. DeCandido of Tor.com gave the episode 6 out of 10.
