= Sprung Monkey =

American alternative rock band

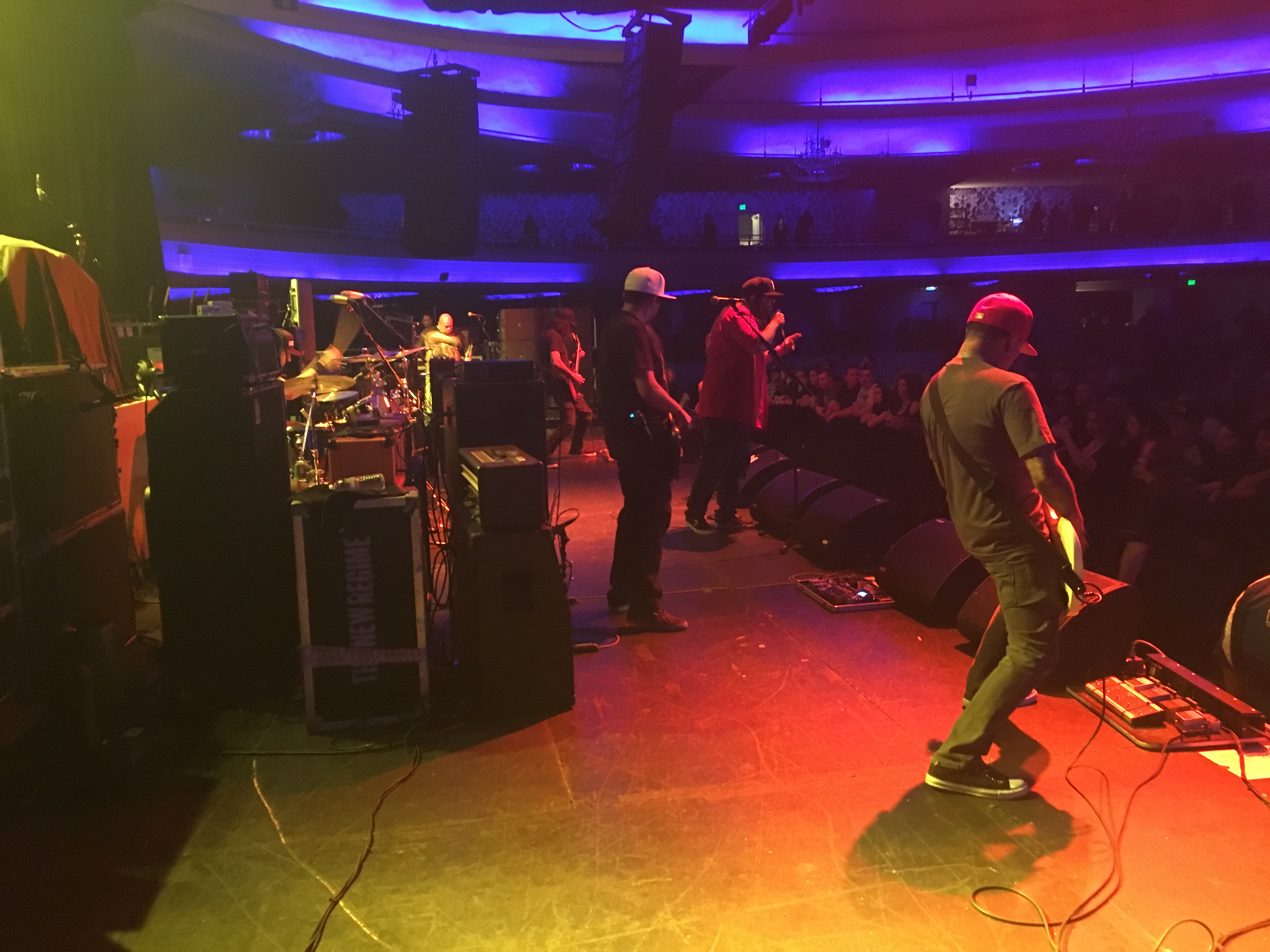
- Sprung Monkey on stage at the Hollywood Palladium March 10, 2016

Background information
- Origin: San Diego, California, U.S.
- Genres: Hard rock; alternative rock; punk rock; funk metal
- Years active: 1991–2002; 2005–2016
- Labels: Pacific; Redline; Hollywood; Surfdog
- Members: Steve Summers; Mike Summers; William Riley; Ernie Longoria; Ryan Flores
- Past members: Frank Melendez; Pat Kim; Tony Delocht; Sleepy Matt
- Website: www.sprungmonkey.com

Sprung Monkey is an American band that originated in San Diego, California, United States, initially active from 1991 to 2002, and again since 2005. Sprung Monkey consisted of five members, Steve Summers (vocals), Mike Summers and William Riley (guitars), Ernie Longoria (drums), and Ryan Flores (bass guitar).

The band achieved mainstream success with their anthem "Get 'Em Outta Here" from their third album, Mr. Funnyface, later featured in the film 10 Things I Hate About You. This success resulted in supporting The Offspring on the Americana tour. Around this time, they were also featured during a segment in the Standard Films snowboard movie TB8 Infinity. They have been included in all three volumes of Music for Our Mother Ocean.

The Sprung Monkey song, "So Cal Loco (Party Like a Rockstar)" appears in the credits of the film Dude, Where's My Car? Also, "Beautiful" was featured in the films Kart Racer and Bookies.

The song "Friends", from their album "Get A Taste" is featured in the end credits of the 2001 comedy "Not Another Teen Movie".

Another song, "Get a Taste", was featured in the movie Van Wilder during two scenes, as well as in the episode of the television show King of the Hill entitled "Uncool Customer."

A third song, "Super Breakdown", was a registered song in the 1999 action sports film, Gravity Games: Bikes.

The band itself made a guest appearance on Buffy the Vampire Slayer's first episode, "Welcome to the Hellmouth", performing the song "Believe". The songs "Saturated", "Swirl" and "Things Are Changing" are also heard in that episode. In addition, the song "Right My Wrong" is heard in "The Harvest", and "Reluctant Man" is heard in "The Pack".

The song "American Made" was included in an episode of Smallville.

The songs "Bleeding", "Mi Mundo es Muerto" and "Man in a Striped Shirt" are included on the soundtrack of Taylor Steele's 1992 surf movie, Momentum.

The songs "Remember", "People", "Love is Dead" and "Stay Down" are featured on the soundtrack of Taylor Steele's 1993 surf movie titled Momentum II.

== Discography ==
Studio albums

- Situation Life (1993)
- Swirl (1995)
- Mr. Funny Face (1998)
- Get A Taste (2001)
- Dead is Dead (2013)

=== Singles ===
List of singles, with selected chart positions
Title	Year	Peak chart positions			Album
Title	Year	US Alt	US Rock	AUS	Album
"Momentum"	1995	—	—	—	(non-album track)
"Swirl"	1995	—	—	—	Swirl
"Get 'Em Outta Here"	1998	13	—	72	Mr. Funny Face
"Super Breakdown"	1998	—	25	—	Mr. Funny Face
"In Spite of It All"	1999	—	—	—	Mr. Funny Face
"Coconut"	1999	—	—	—	Get a Taste
"So Cal Loco (Party Like a Rockstar)"	2000	—	—	—	Get a Taste
"What's That You Say"	2001	—	—	—	Get a Taste
"Save Me" (with Mike Muir)	2013	—	—	—	Dead Is Dead
"Dead Is Dead"	2013	—	—	—	Dead Is Dead

Timeline
