= John Oszajca =

American singer-songwriter (born 1974)

John Oszajca (born May 8, 1974) is an American singer-songwriter.

== Early life ==
Oszajca was born and raised in Waimanalo, Hawaii.

After relocating to Los Angeles, Oszajca became a part of the Los Angeles music scene.

== Career ==
He was signed to Interscope Records for whom he released his debut album, From There to Here, and later to Warner Bros. Records, for whom he released First Sign of Anything. Oszajca's third album, Elephant Graveyard was released in 2007 on Dreamy Draw Records.

He also appeared in the films Dead and Breakfast, Other Peoples Parties, America Speaks Out; and the television program, ER.

== Personal life ==
John was engaged to Lisa Marie Presley from 1999 to 2001. He is now married to Keshama Jane O'Donnell, with whom he has three children: River (b. 2010), Winter (b. 2012) and Rainey (b. 2019). The couple bought the property in New Zealand where Oszajca's wife grew up, and continue to split their time between Los Angeles and New Zealand.

== Discography ==
- From There to Here (2000) Interscope Records
- First Sign of Anything (2006) Warner Bros. Records
- Elephant Graveyard (2007) Dreamy Draw Music
