= Dave Kaplan (music executive) =

American music industry executive

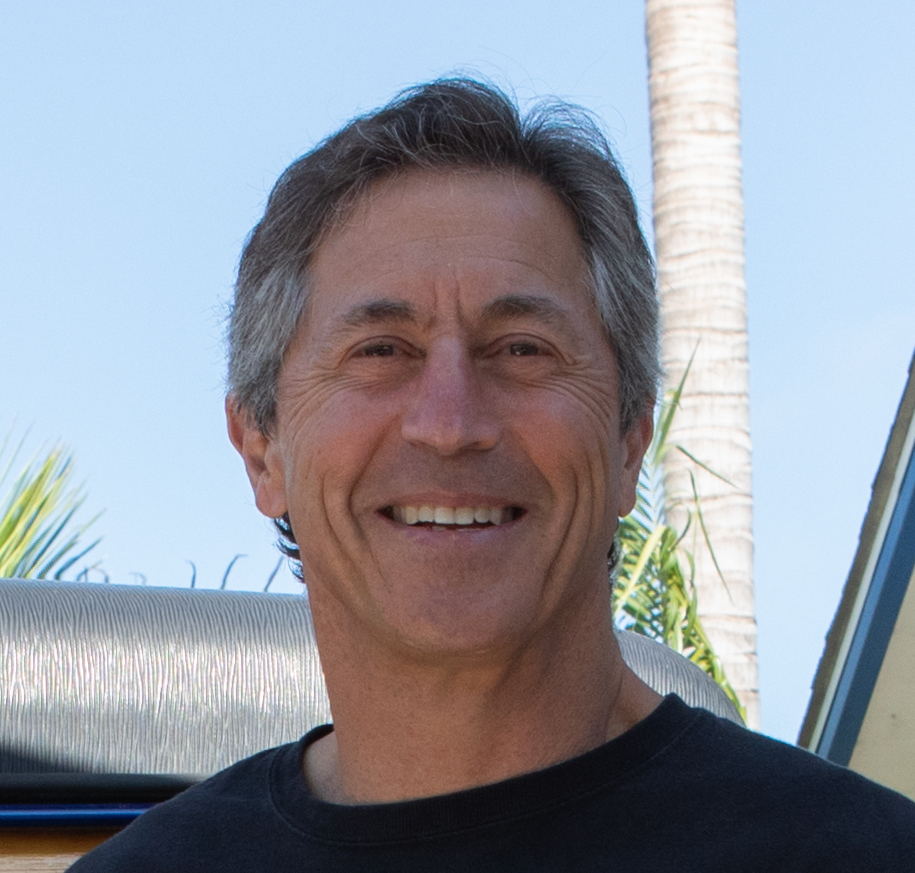
- Born: Phoenix, Arizona
- Occupations: executive, record producer
- Years active: 1981−present

Dave Kaplan is an American music industry executive. He has managed numerous musical artists, including UB40, Glen Campbell, Dave Stewart of the Eurythmics, Brian Setzer, Sublime, and Butthole Surfers. He founded and is the CEO of the independent music label Surfdog Records. Kaplan's producing credits include albums for Dave Stewart, Glen Campbell, Brian Setzer, Stray Cats, Dan Hicks, SuperHeavy, and Gary Hoey.

== Early life and education ==
Kaplan was born in Phoenix, Arizona. He graduated from UC Santa Barbara, and later became a certified public accountant.

== Career ==
Kaplan joined the accounting firm Ernst & Whinney in California as an auditor in 1981, but left in 1983 because he disliked the firm's rigid work culture.

In 1985, he founded Dave Kaplan Management (DKM) to manage musicians. DKM's first client was the reggae band UB40.

Kaplan became the manager for Brian Setzer in 1992, and as of 2021, Kaplan had also produced or co-produced more than a dozen albums involving Setzer.

Kaplan founded Surfdog Records in the early 1990s.

In 1999, Kaplan became the manager for Butthole Surfers, and signed the act to a joint recording deal with Surfdog and Hollywood Records.

Kaplan signed recording deals with Dan Hicks and His Hot Licks, led by Dan Hicks, in 2000 and British soul singer Joss Stone in 2011 to co-produce her album LP1. He produced or was the executive producer for six of Hicks' albums between 2000 and 2017, and was the executive producer for Stone's LP1 album.

In 2012, Kaplan became co-manager of country singer Glen Campbell, who had just been diagnosed with Alzheimer's disease, and was the executive producer of his final album Ghost on the Canvas. Kaplan was also the producer of Campbell's penultimate studio album, See You There.

In 2013, Kaplan signed Eric Clapton to Surfdog Records and distributed his new album, Old Sock, in North America.

Kaplan is also the manager of the band Sublime. In 2019, Kaplan was a co-producer of a documentary about the band Sublime, which was titled Sublime.

== Charitable activities ==
Kaplan served on the board of directors for an environmental non-profit called the Surfrider Foundation. From 1996 through 1999, he also produced or co-produced three ocean-themed music albums to benefit the foundation, which included contributions from bands such as The Beach Boys, The Beastie Boys, and Pearl Jam.

== Personal life ==
Kaplan and his family live in southern California. He is a surfing enthusiast.
