= Dave Darling =

American record producer (born 1958)

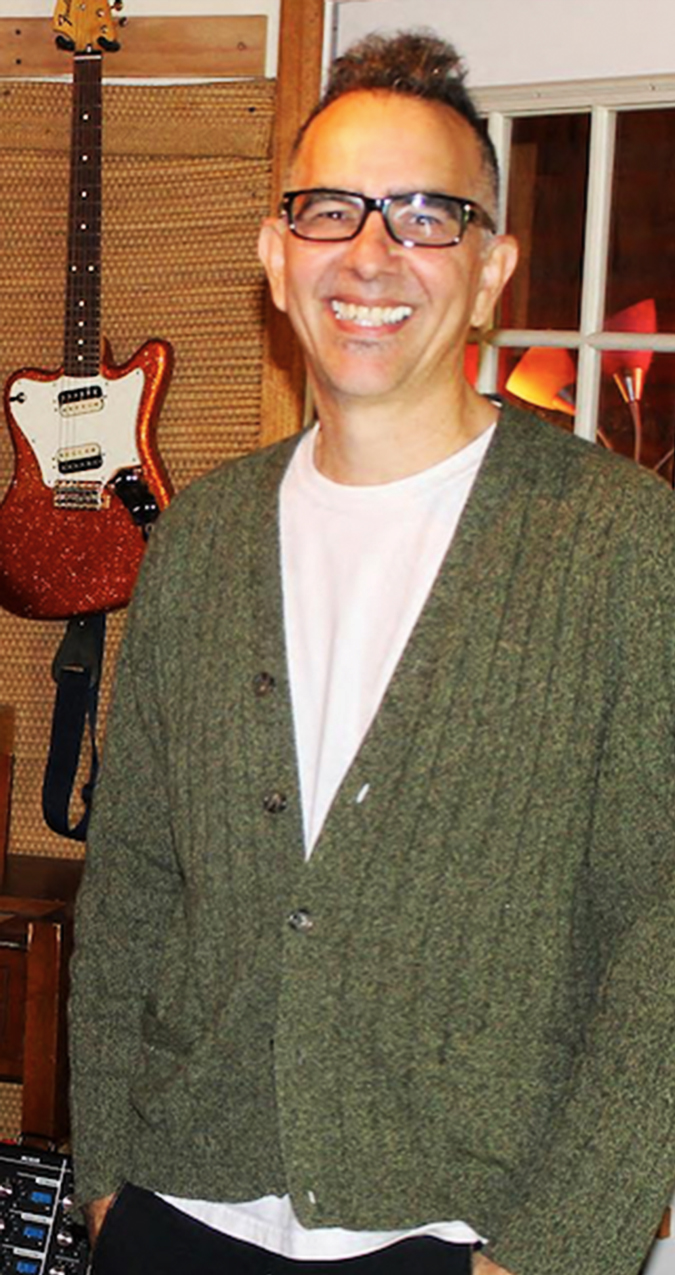
- Darling in 2013
- Born: Dave Darling; April 20, 1958 (age 68); San Francisco, California U.S.
- Occupations: Record Producer; Musician; Singer-Songwriter; Mixer
- Spouse: Brie Howard Darling (m. 1993)
- Musical career
- Genres: Rock; Pop; Blues; Indie-rock; Rockabilly
- Instruments: Vocals; Bass; Guitar; Keyboards
- Labels: Atlantic; BMG
- Website: davedarlingmusic.com

Dave Darling (born on April 20, 1958 in San Francisco, California, United States) is an American record producer, songwriter, mixer, and multi-instrumentalist. He relocated to Los Angeles, California, in 1980 while recording an album project and decided to stay in Los Angeles to pursue a career in music. Darling has worked with many successful recording artists such as The Temptations, Glen Campbell, The Brian Setzer Orchestra, Stray Cats, Ricky Lee Jones, Rusty Young, John Waite, Def Leppard, Tom Waits, Janiva Magness, Jack Johnson, Cherie Currie, Brie Howard and more. He has produced six Grammy nominated records. In addition to being a record producer, Darling, has been a member of several bands, most notably Boxing Gandhis and 58.

== Professional music career ==
=== Brian Setzer ===
Darling has produced and mixed ten albums with Brian Setzer, The Brian Setzer Orchestra, and The Stray Cats, five of which were nominated for Grammy Awards. Setzer Goes Instru-Mental! was nominated for a Grammy Award for Best Pop Instrumental album in 2011. Darling appeared in the video documentary, Stray Cats: Rumble in Brixton in 2004 and It's a Rockabilly World! documentary in 2016.

=== Janiva Magness ===
Darling has produced six records for singer, Janiva Magness. Her 2016 release, Love Wins Again, (co-written and produced by Darling) was nominated for a Grammy Award for Best Contemporary Blues Album. The album debuted at number 5 on the Billboard Blues Chart, number 2 on iTunes Blues, reached number 1 on the Blues radio chart, and spent two months on the Americana radio chart. Their collaborative, I Won't Cry won Song of the Year at the Blues Music Awards in 2013.

=== Boxing Gandhis ===
Darling is the founder of Boxing Gandhis which was signed to the record label Mesa in 1993. The band has recorded four albums. They climbed the charts with a No. 5 hit on the Billboard Triple A (Adult Album Alternative) charts with the song, "If You Love Me (Why Am I Dyin')" off their debut album after touring the US as opening act for the Dave Matthews Band and Big Head Todd and the Monsters. The song's video also garnered a Billboard Music Award for "Best Jazz/Adult Contemporary" which was directed by Brian Lockwood. "If You Love Me (Why Am I Dyin')" was featured in Episode 3 of the 2011 season of the HBO Original Series True Blood.

- Boxing Gandhis (1994, Mesa Records)
- Howard (1996, Atlantic Records)
- Culture War (2019, Blue Elan Records)

=== 58 ===
58 was an eclectic, alternative, pop-rock band foursome that included Darling, Nikki Sixx, Steve Gibb and Bucket Baker. They released, Diet for a New America on May 16, 2000, on Sixx's record label, Americoma.

== Film, television, and commercials ==
Darling's music and/or production has been placed in films, TV shows, and commercials such as True Blood, So You Think You Can Dance, Ed TV, Father of the Bride, What a Girl Wants, Entourage, Chuck, Bad Girls Club, Ugly Betty, Ritz Crackers, and Lincoln Navigator.

== Discography ==
Year	Album	Artist	Credit
2018	Love Is An Army	Janiva Magness	Producer, Mixing, Guitar, composer
2018	All The Time	The Temptations	Producer, Mixing
2017	Blue Again	Janiva Magness	Producer, Mixing
2017	Greatest Licks: I Feel Like Singin'	Dan Hicks & His Hot Licks	Producer, Keyboards, Percussion
2017	Peaceful Easy Feeling: The Sounds of Jack Tempchin	Jack Tempchin	Additional Production
2017	Tug of War	Gina Sicilia	Producer, Bass, composer, Guitar, Guitar (Acoustic), Mixing, Vocals (Background)
2017	Shakey Ground	Kyle Maack	Producer, Mixing, Guitar, composer
2106	Find Your Wings	Anna Danes	Producer, Mixing, composer
2106	Love Wins Again	Janiva Magness	Producer, Mixing, Guitar, Dobro, Celeste, Glockenspeil, Vocals (Background), Bass
2015	Rockin Rudolph	The Brian Setzer Orchestra/Brian Setzer	Additional Production
2014	Original	Janiva Magness	Producer, engineer, Mixing, Guitar, Dobro, Golckenspiel, Vocals (Background), Bass
2013	Live at Davies	Dan Hicks & His Hot Licks	Keyboards
2013	See You There	Glen Campbell	Producer, Mixing, Guitar
2012	Living Like a Runaway	Lita Ford	Composer
2012	Rockabilly Riot! Live From the Planet	Brian Setzer	Mixing
2012	Stronger For It	Janiva Magness	Producer, engineer, Mixing, Bass, composer, Guitar, Guitar (Acoustic), Guitar (Electric), Piano, Toy Piano, Vocals (Background)
2011	Alligator Records 40th Anniversary Collection		Producer
2011	Rough & Tumble	John Waite	Mixing
2011	Setzer Goes Instru-MENTAL!	Brian Setzer	Producer, Mixing
2010	Christmas Comes Alive!	The Brian Setzer Orchestra	Mixing
2010	Don't Mess With a Big Band: Live!	The Brian Setzer Orchestra	Mixing
2010	Runner Runner	Runner Runner	Producer, engineer, Mixing
2010	The Devil is an Angel Too	Janiva Magness	Engineer, Mixing, Guitar, Acoustic Guitar, Keyboards Vocals (Background), Wurlitzer
2009	Songs From Lonely Avenue	Brian Setzer	Producer, Mixer
2009	Sounds of Defeat	Until June	Producer, Mixing
2008	Alive!	Becca	Bass, composer, Guitar, Keyboards, Programming
2008	Christmas Rocks! The Best of Collection	The Brian Setzer Orchestra	Producer
2008	Christmas a Go-Go		Producer
2008	Raise Up The Tent	Tea Leaf Green	Mixing
2008	Turn to Stone	Becca	Producer, Keyboards, Programming
2008	What Love Will Do	Janiva Magness	Producer, engineer, Mixing, Guitar, Handclapping, Percussion, Vocals (Background), Bass
2007	Elephant Graveyard	John Oszajca	Producer, engineer, Mixing, Guitar, Guitar (Acoustic), Keyboards, Drums Percussion, Programming, Vocals (Background), Bass, Mastering
2007	Moondance Alexander		Composer
2007	Musicians For Minneapolis		Producer
2007	No Place Like Soul	Soulive	Tracking
2007	Red Hot & Live	Brian Setzer & The Nashvillains	Mixing
2007	Wobble with the World	Cindy Alexander	composer
2007	Wolfgang's Big Night Out	The Brian Setzer Orchestra	Producer, Audio Production
2006	13	Brian Setzer	Producer, Mixing, Audio Production
2006	Eclectic Café: The Complete Coffee House Collection		Producer
2006	Music is Hope		Guitar, Keyboards
2006	Wylde Bunch	The Wild Bunch	Mixing
2005	Break For Love: Danny Rampling		Mixing
2005	Dig That Crazy Christmas	The Brian Setzer Orchestra	Producer, Audio Production
2005	First Sign of Anything	John Oszajca	Producer, engineer, Audio Production, Main Personnel, Guitar, Keyboards, Programming, Vocals (Background), Bass, composer
2005	Rockabilly Riot, Vol. 1: A Tribute to Sun Records	Brian Setzer	Producer
2005	Sweet Saxations	Pamela Williams	Audio Engineer
2004	Avion (Console/Image)	Avion	Producer
2004	Glean	EchoBrain	Producer
2004	Rumble in Brixton	Stray Cats	Producer
2004	Selected Shorts	Dan Hicks	Producer, Mixing, Percussion
2004	Shine	Meredith Brooks	Producer, engineer, Guitar, Keyboards, Programming, Vocals (Background), Bass, composer
2004	Songs For a Rainy Day	Cyndi Vellmure	Producer, engineer, Guitar, Acoustic Guitar, Keyboards, Bass
2004	Where Lovers Meet	Meredith Brooks	Producer
2004	Words, Wisdom, and Music	Alvin Green & The Unlimited Sounds	Producer, Mixing
2003	Jump, Jive an' Wail the Best of The Brian Setzer Orchestra 1994–2000	The Brian Setzer Orchestra	Producer, Mixing
2003	Luck Be a Lady	The Brian Setzer Orchestra	Producer
2003	Nitro Burnin' Funny Daddy	Brian Setzer	Producer, Mixing
2003	Smash	Cindy Alexander	Producer, engineer, Mixing, Guitar, Keyboards, Bass, Loop
2003	Untucked	Katrina Carlson	Producer, engineer, Guitar, Acoustic Guitar, Keyboards, Vocals (Background), Musical Direction
2003	What a Girl Wants		Producer, engineer, Mixing
2002	Bad Bad One	Meredith Brooks	Producer, engineer, Guitar, Keyboards, Programming, Vocals (Background), composer
2002	BareNaked	Jennifer Love Hewitt	Engineer, guitar, Programming, Bass, composer
2002	Best of Big Band	The Brian Setzer Orchestra	Producer
2002	Boogie Woogie Christmas	The Brian Setzer Orchestra	Producer, Audio Production
2002	Chilled Sirens		Producer
2002	Shiny Things	Jackpot	Producer, Mixing
2001	Get a Taste	Sprung Monkey	Producer, composer
2001	Party Like a Rock Star	Sprung Monkey	Producer, composer
2001	Renaissance Ibiza: 2001 Collection	New York Renaissance Band	Engineer
2001	Very Best of Ibiza Anthems		Engineer
2000	Beatin' the Heat	Dan Hicks & His Hot Licks	Producer, composer
2000	Vavoom	The Brian Setzer Orchestra	Producer, Mixing, Associate Producer
2000	Diet For a New America	58	Producer, engineer, Mixing, Programming, songwriter
2000	Jeremy Kay	Jeremy Kay	Producer, engineer
1999	Deconstruction	Meredith Brooks	Producer, Percussion, Programming
1999	EDtv		Producer
1999	Raingods With Zippos	Fish	Photography
1999	See Red	Cindy Alexander	Producer, engineer, Audio Engineer, Mixing, Personnel, Guitar, Horn, Bass Percussion, Programming, composer
1997	Generation Swine	Mötley Crüe	Guitar
1997	Yesterday, Today, Tomorrow: The Greatest Hits	Kenny Loggins	Guitar
1996	Howard	Boxing Gandhis	Producer, engineer, Vocals, Guitar
1996	Real World	Tin Drum	Guitar (Acoustic)
1994	Boxing Gandhis	Boxing Gandhis	Producer, Vocals, Guitar, Percussion, Bass, composer
1992	California Dreams	California Dreams	Guitar
1988	Little Lives	Adele Bertei	Guitar
1987	Big Trouble	Big Trouble	Guitar
1987	Big Trouble	Big Trouble	Guitar
