= Roderick Falconer =

English cricketer

Roderick Falconer was an English cricketer active from 1907 to 1914 who played for Northamptonshire (Northants). He was born in Scole, Suffolk on 10 November 1886 and died in Malvern, Worcestershire on 8 March 1966. He appeared in seven first-class matches as a righthanded batsman who bowled right arm medium pace. He scored 29 runs with a highest score of 12 not out and took nine wickets with a best performance of two for 13.
