= 58 (band) =

American rock band (1996–2000)

- 58 in 2000

Background information
- Origin: Los Angeles, California
- Genres: Rock; glam metal; hip hop; funk; pop; alternative metal
- Years active: 1996–2000
- Labels: Americoma; Beyond Music
- Past members: Nikki Sixx; Steve Gibb; Bucket Baker; Dave Darling

58 was an American rock band, a side project involving Nikki Sixx of Mötley Crüe and producer Dave Darling, Sixx's former father-in-law. The band name originates from the fact that both Sixx and Darling were born in 1958. The band also included Steve Gibb (son of the Bee Gees' Barry Gibb) on guitar and Bucket Baker on drums. The band described themselves as a mixture of "glam, hip hop, rock, pop, funk and a car crash."

They released one album, Diet for a New America, in June 2000 on Americoma Records, an imprint of Beyond Music.

The original demo for "1958" was recorded in 1996. The demo was produced by Scott Humphrey and assistant engineer Brian VanPortfleet. The entire seven track demo was recorded and mixed in two weeks.

== Members ==
- Steve Gibb - guitar
- Nikki Sixx - bass guitar
- Bucket Baker - drums
- Dave Darling - guitar, vocals, producer

== Discography ==
- Diet for a New America - 2000
