= Boxing Gandhis =

American soul band

- Origin: Los Angeles
- Genres: Funk, Soul
- Years active: 1994–present
- Labels: Mesa, Atlantic, Blue Élan Records
- Members: Eric M. Fowler; Teddy Andreadis; Brie Howard-Darling; Alfredo Ballesteros; Ernie Perez; Yukihide Takiyama; Gary Pavlika
- Past members: David Darling; David Kitay; Carl Sealove; Steve Samuel; Allon Sams

The Boxing Gandhis are an American alternative funk/soul band from Los Angeles founded by music producer David Darling. The group was signed to the record label Mesa in 1993 and scored a number 5 hit on the Radio & Records Triple A (Adult Album Alternative) chart with the song "If You Love Me (Why Am I Dyin')" off their debut album. The song's video also garnered a Billboard Music Award for "Best Jazz/Adult Contemporary" and was directed by Brian Lockwood.

The group was signed to Atlantic Records and released Howard. The album failed to gain radio popularity and the band went on hiatus. The group released an EP of new material in 2008 titled 3rd 2nd Chance and released a digital download-only EP on iTunes titled Brand New Start in 2011. "If You Love Me (Why Am I Dyin')" was featured in episode 3 of the 2011 season of the HBO series True Blood.
