= Anna Danes =

American singer-songwriter

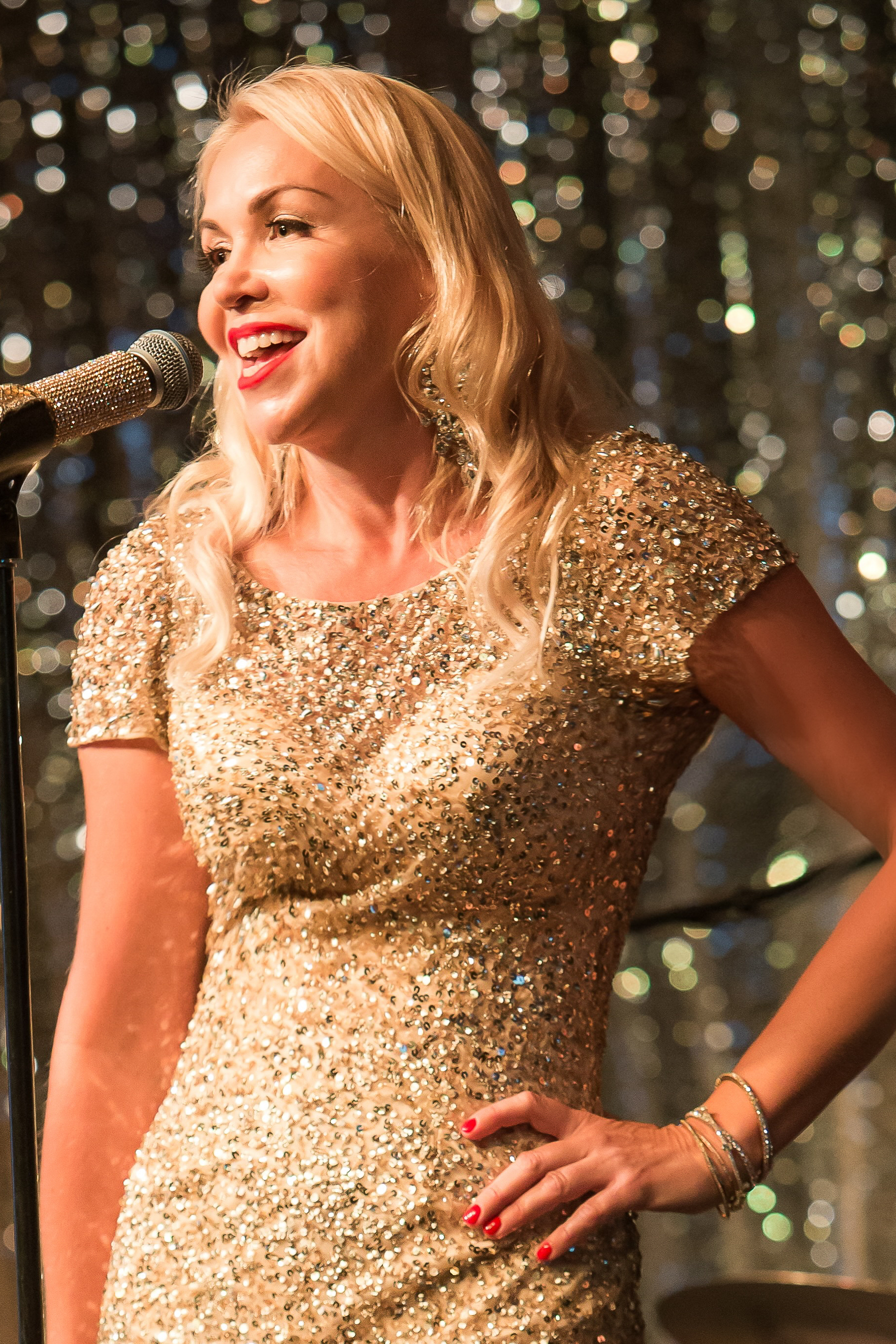
- Danes Performing in 2015
- Born: Olga Anna Dmochowska; July 4, 1969 (age 57); Gdańsk, Poland
- Occupation: Singer-songwriter
- Years active: 2011–present
- Children: 1
- Musical career
- Genres: Jazz; Adult Contemporary; Pop
- Instrument: Vocals
- Label: DLG Recordings
- Website: annadanes.com

Anna Danes (born Olga Anna Dmochowska; July 4, 1969) is an Polish-born American singer-songwriter. She began her recording career as a jazz vocalist, releasing the albums Longing (2014) and Find Your Wings (2016); the latter reached number 22 on Billboard's jazz albums chart. She has since turned toward writing and performing original singer-songwriter material.

== Early life ==
Danes grew up behind the Iron Curtain in Sopot, Poland, near the Baltic coast town of Gdansk. Her love for music started when she was a young girl, listening to bootleg cassette tapes of Western pop music and attending the summer music festival in Sopot where she was mesmerized by the sparkly stage costumes and sounds of the times: disco and European pop music, with major influences coming from ABBA, Demis Roussos, Shirley Bassey and Boney M. In 1979, at 10 years old, Danes and her parents escaped (then-communist) Poland to Sweden. They later immigrated to Ottawa, Canada. She earned her bachelor's degree at the University of Ottawa in ancient history and archaeology and graduated from the University of Windsor with a law degree and became a practicing attorney in Toronto, Canada.

In 2000, Anna moved to San Diego, California, got married and had a daughter. In 2011, at the age of 42, Anna took her daughter to a singing lesson, but when the then 8 year-old refused to continue, Anna stepped in and suddenly discovered her talent and love for singing, starting a new chapter of her life.

Growing up in stark times in communist Poland, Anna has cited music as a source of joy. She has said that “even when the world is a complex and challenging place, we have music.”

== Music career ==
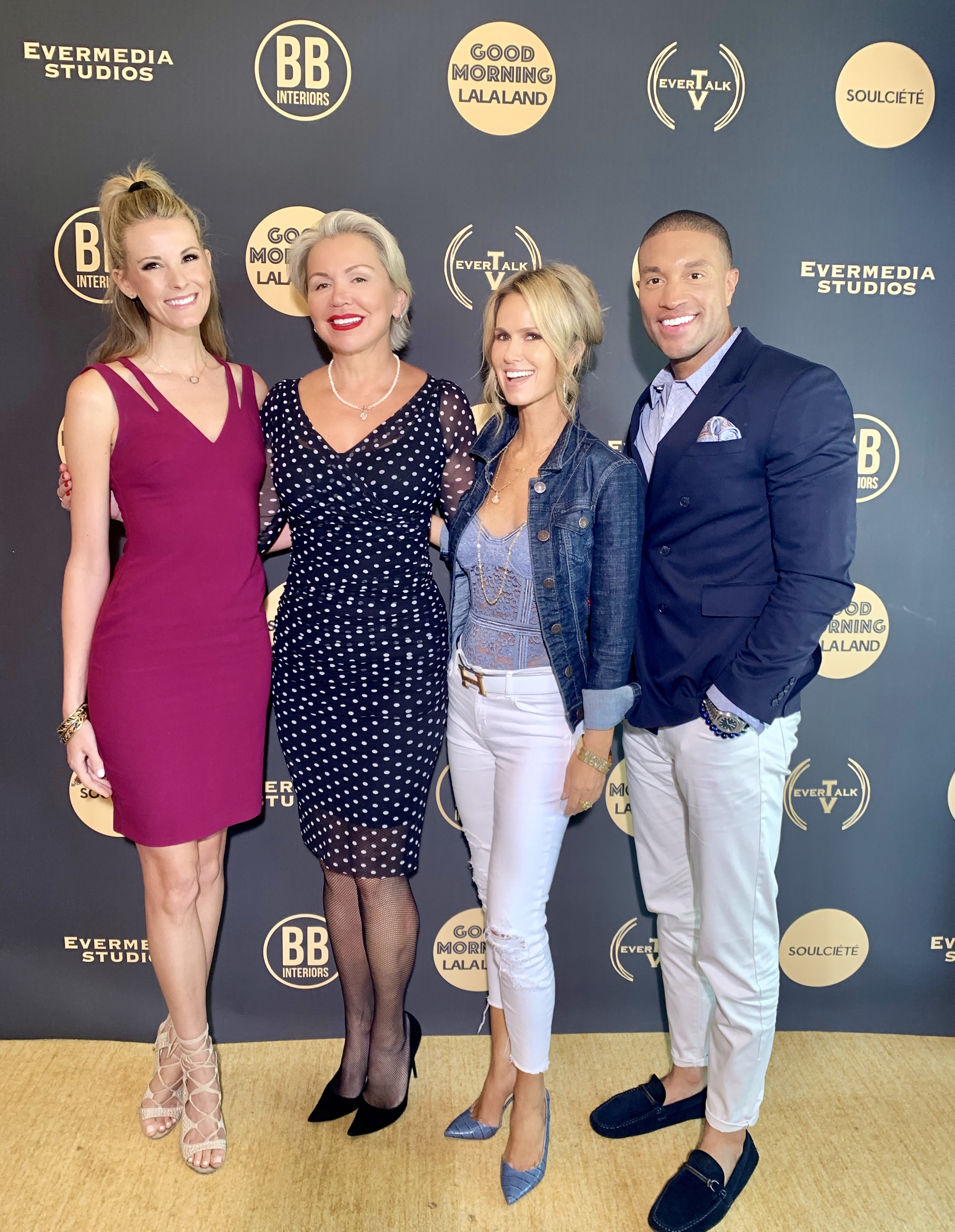
Danes with Hosts of Good Morning LA LA Land, 2019

Danes' 2nd album, Find Your Wings (Album), released in 2016, debuted on iTunes jazz albums at #1 and peaked at #22 on the Billboard Charts. Danes’ debut album, Longing, was released in 2014 and received positive reviews from the jazz press and others.

She has performed The Star-Spangled Banner multiple times at events such as opening day at Del Mar Futurity, an American Thoroughbred horse race held at Del Mar Racetrack in Del Mar, California for an audience of 45,000 and at UCLA’s Pauley Pavilion for an audience of 14,000.

Danes has been featured on The Today Show, KSBW-TV, and Good Morning Lalaland and her music has been reviewed in Broadway World, Jazzed Magazine, and The Jazz World as well as KSDS Jazz 88.3 and many other media outlets.

In a feature article in the Huffington Post, Danes shares her experiences in pursuing a music career as a former Stay at Home Mom: "In many ways, you need LESS to succeed than you think! #1 is perseverance. Most other things can be learned and acquired. But if there is a WILL, you will find a way — just stay with it! I THOUGHT I needed all this “stuff” and a team of people to be noticed in show business."

== Writer and speaker ==
Danes is a two-time breast cancer survivor. In her blog post, “Cancer Part 1: Vanity Saved My Life,” she shares how she was diagnosed with breast cancer after an elective breast lift procedure revealed cancer cells in the removed breast tissue. "I am making my story public in order to demystify the disease more and to potentially help others. I am one of the lucky ones: my cancer was caught early."

In her TEDx talk, Find Your Wings, (presented in Solana Beach, California on August 25, 2018) she shares a message of facing your fears—in ANY challenge.

Danes creates talks that include music where she shares stories and experiences from her own life ranging from escaping (then-communist) Poland and immigrating to Sweden, getting past the fear of a cancer diagnosis, leaving a long-term marriage into the unknown, listening to your body, and the power of positive thinking.

Danes has been a featured guest on podcasts such as the LOTL Radio Podcast The Zone.

== Acting career ==
Danes plays the role of Liriope in the 2018 film, Fatal Perfection which won an Honorable Mention for Screenplay Short at the LA Film Awards in September, 2018. In 2017, Danes was a featured storyteller on Radio Theatre For Your Soul, sharing the inspiration behind her songwriting, which was later released as a docu-story in 2021.

In 2022, Danes was featured in the 7 time award-winning documentary, Finding Inner Hero which examines how individuals use tragic turns to self-reflect, and to refocus towards living more joyful, authentic, meaningful lives.

== Music event producer ==
Danes' music event production company, Anna Danes Presents, has produced private, charity, and corporate events for clients such as The San Diego Symphony, the Association of Fundraising Professionals, Neiman Marcus, and has created the concert series, Jazz on Cedros, in San Diego, California.

== Discography ==
- "La Vie En Rose" (Single) - 2013
- Longing - 2014
- Find Your Wings - 2016
- "The Christmas Song" (duet with Richard Shetton) (Single) - 2017
