= Surfdog Records =

American record label and music company

- Parent company: Warner Music Group
- Founded: 1993
- Founder: Dave Kaplan
- Distributor: Alternative Distribution Alliance (U.S.)
- Genre: Rock; punk rock; swing; rockabilly; reggae; lounge; alternative rock
- Country of origin: U.S.
- Location: Encinitas, California
- Official website: www.surfdog.com

Surfdog Records is a record label, music publishing company, merchandising company, and marketing company based in Encinitas, California. Its roster includes artists of the rock, punk, swing, rockabilly, reggae, lounge, and alternative genres. It has released over 150 albums, including recordings by Stray Cats, Brian Setzer & The Brian Setzer Orchestra, Eric Clapton, Slightly Stoopid, Dan Hicks, Butthole Surfers, Glen Campbell, Joss Stone, Dave Stewart (co-founder of Eurythmics), Richard Cheese, Gary Hoey, and Sprung Monkey.

== History ==
=== Early years ===
The foundation of the company was established in 1985, when Surfdog Records' owner Dave Kaplan began Dave Kaplan Management Inc. Dave Kaplan and his staff have managed the careers of artists including UB40, Brian Setzer, Dave Stewart (co-founder of Eurythmics), Glen Campbell, Stray Cats, Sublime, Ryan Adams, Gary Hoey, Butthole Surfers and BulletBoys.

Iconic American musician Brian Setzer (formerly of Stray Cats), also managed by Dave Kaplan Management Inc., has released over 16 albums through Surfdog Records. Since 2000, Setzer has won three Grammy Awards, as well as receiving his seventh Grammy nomination (out of twelve nominations in total) in 2007 for his album Wolfgang's Big Night Out released on Surfdog Records. In 2003, Slightly Stoopid released the album Everything You Need on Surfdog Records, which included some of the band’s biggest hits such as “Collie Man”, “Officer”, and “Sweet Honey”.

Dave Stewart, best known for his work as co-founder of the British pop-rock duo Eurythmics, joined Surfdog's roster in 2007, and shortly thereafter released his album The Dave Stewart Songbook Vol. 1. Followed by his 2011 release through Surfdog Records The Blackbird Diaries.

British soul singer Joss Stone released her fifth studio album LP1 through Surfdog Records in partnership with her own Stone'd Records in 2011. Stone co-wrote and co-produced the album with Dave Stewart.

In 2011, Surfdog Records signed Glen Campbell releasing his album Ghost On The Canvas, an album intended to be Campbell's farewell to studio recording following being diagnosed with Alzheimer's disease. Campbell in 2012 received a Grammy Lifetime Achievement Award for his contributions to music throughout his 50 years plus career.

=== 2013–2015 ===
In 2013, Surfdog announced the signing of a collaboration with rock and roll legend Eric Clapton for Clapton's new record Old Sock, released on March 12, 2013, followed by 3 more studio Clapton records: The Breeze, I Still Do, and Happy Xmas.

On April 22, 2014, Drake Bell released his first studio album since 2006's It's Only Time with Universal Motown Records, Ready Steady Go!, after signing on with Surfdog in 2012. The record debuted at #182 on the Billboard 200, #50 on the Billboard Top Rock Albums, and #32 on the Billboard Top Independent Albums charts. It sold 2,000 copies in its first week of release. The record contains songs originally by Billy Joel, Queen, The Kinks, Stray Cats, and more. Brian Setzer, frontman of Stray Cats and also on the Surfdog roster, produced the album. "Bull", a song on Ready Steady Go!, was on the top 10 charts in Mexico for several weeks.

On May 19, 2014, The Burning of Rome's Year of The Ox was released by Surfdog Records.

On July 29, 2014, Eric Clapton & Friends released The Breeze: An Appreciation of JJ Cale. The Breeze is full of covers of songs originally by J.J. Cale and contains vocals by Mark Knopfler, Willie Nelson, John Mayer, Tom Petty, and Don White. The album received much attention, achieving a #2 debut on the Billboard Top 200 album charts.

On August 12, 2014, Brian Setzer released Rockabilly Riot! All Original, through Surfdog. The record contains new music from Setzer and was widely accepted by music critics. “Let's Shake” was the first single of the record.

On October 21, 2014, Brian Setzer's 1959 Gretsch 6120 was inducted into the world-renowned Smithsonian Institution in Washington D.C. Setzer's guitar joined a large and diverse collection of musical instruments at the museum that include John Coltrane's saxophone, Dizzy Gillespie's trumpet, and Eddie Van Halen's guitar.

On August 11, 2015, Sublime announced a deal with Dave Kaplan Management/Surfdog Records, managing the branding, merchandising, licensing, music catalog and new ventures. On October 16, 2015, Brian Setzer was joined with an 18-piece orchestra for the release of his newest Christmas record, Rockin’ Rudolph.

=== 2016–present ===
On May 20, 2016, Eric Clapton released his twenty-third studio solo album, I Still Do on Surfdog Records/Bushbranch Records. Clapton reunited with record producer Glyn Johns and had the album's artwork painted by Sir Peter Blake who also previously worked with Clapton.

On February 24, 2017, Surfdog Records released Greatest Licks – I Feel Like Singin’, an album that honored Dan Hicks on the first anniversary of his passing.

On October 12, 2018, Eric Clapton released his first-ever Christmas album, Happy Xmas on Surfdog Records/Bushbranch Records. Happy Xmas is Clapton's 24th studio album and features cover art illustration by Clapton himself.

November 2018, The Brian Setzer Orchestra celebrated their 15th Anniversary Christmas Rocks! Tour presented by SiriusXM.

In 2019, Stray Cats celebrated their 40th anniversary with a new album and tour. The album, titled 40 was released via Surfdog Records on May 24, 2019. This marked the band's first new music in 26 years.

== Surfdog Music Publishing and Licensing ==
Surfdog music has been featured in many motion pictures including Puss In Boots, Elf, Mission: Impossible, Monsters vs. Aliens, Dude, Where's My Car? Buffy the Vampire Slayer, Stuart Little, and The Real World. Plus major national commercials, including Ford Lincoln-Mercury, Ashton Kutcher's Nikon and Hallmark.

== Philanthropy ==
Surfdog Records has released three MOM (Music For Mother Ocean) albums, and those three albums contributed to the largest donation in Surfrider Foundation's history up till then. The three MOM albums feature some of the biggest artists in music today, including; Paul McCartney, Pearl Jam, The Ramones, Beastie Boys, Red Hot Chili Peppers, Blink-182, Snoop Dogg and members of Rage Against the Machine, The Beach Boys and No Doubt.

== Current and archive artists on Surfdog Records ==
- Brian Setzer
- Eric Clapton (co-label: Bushbranch/Surfdog)
- Stray Cats
- Agent 51
- Alien Fashion Show
- Ballyhoo!
- Blush
- Butthole Surfers
- Dan Hicks & The Hot Licks
- Dave Stewart
- Drake Bell
- Dylan Donkin
- Echobrain
- Glen Campbell
- Gibby Haynes & His Problem
- Gary Hoey
- Jackpot
- Jeremy Kay
- Joss Stone (co-label: Stone'd/Surfdog)
- Pato Banton
- Richard Cheese
- Rusty Anderson
- Slightly Stoopid
- Sprung Monkey
- Tea Leaf Green
- The Burning Of Rome
- Wylde Bunch
- Voivod

== Current and archive artists on Dave Kaplan Management ==
- Brian Setzer
- Sublime
- Stray Cats
- Dave Stewart
- Agent 51
- Ballyhoo!
- Blush
- Butthole Surfers
- Dan Hicks & The Hot Licks
- Drake Bell
- Dylan Donkin
- Echobrain
- Glen Campbell (co-management)
- Gibby Haynes & His Problem
- Jackpot
- Jeremy Kay
- Joss Stone
- Pato Banton
- Richard Cheese
- Rusty Anderson
- Sprung Monkey
- Tea Leaf Green
- The Schizophonics
- The Burning Of Rome
- Wylde Bunch
- Beat Root Revival

== See also ==
- List of record labels
