= Grammy Award for Best Arrangement, Instrumental or A Cappella =

Annual music award

- Awarded for: Quality arrangements of instrumental or a cappella compositions
- Country: United States
- Presented by: National Academy of Recording Arts and Sciences
- First award: 1963
- Currently held by: Bryan Carter, Charlie Rosen & Matthew Whitaker – "Super Mario Praise Break" (The 8-Bit Big Band) (2026)
- Website: grammy.com

The Grammy Award for Best Instrumental Arrangement (and its subsequent name changes) has been awarded since 1963. The award is presented to the arranger(s) of the music. Only songs or tracks are eligible, no longer works (e.g. albums). The performing artist does not receive a Grammy, except if they are also the arranger.

There have been several minor changes to the name of the award:

- From 1963 to 1981 the award was known as Best Instrumental Arrangement
- From 1982 to 1983 it was awarded as Best Arrangement on an Instrumental Recording
- From 1984 to 1994 it was awarded as Best Arrangement on an Instrumental
- From 1995 to 2014 it was again awarded as Best Instrumental Arrangement
- Since 2015 it has been awarded as Best Arrangement, Instrumental or A Cappella, which also includes vocal arrangements for a cappella performances.

Years reflect the year in which the Grammy Awards were presented, for works released in the previous year.

== Recipients ==
=== 1960s ===
Year^{[I]}	Nominee(s)	Work	Artist(s)
1963	Henry Mancini	"Baby Elephant Walk"	Henry Mancini
1963	Robert Farnon	Sensuous Strings of Robert Farnon	Robert Farnon and His Orchestra
1963	Joe Harnell	"Fly Me to the Moon Bossa Nova"	Joe Harnell and His Orchestra
1963	Quincy Jones	The Quintessence	Quincy Jones
1963	Nelson Riddle	Route 66 Theme	Nelson Riddle and His Orchestra
1963	Dave Rose	"The Stripper"	Dave Rose
1963	Eddie Sauter	"Focus"	Stan Getz
1964	Quincy Jones	"I Can't Stop Loving You"	Count Basie
1964	Robert N. Enevoldsen	"Gravy Waltz"	Steve Allen
1964	Marty Gold and Peter Nero	"Mountain Greenery"	Peter Nero
1964	Claus Ogerman	"More"	Kai Winding
1964	Joe Sherman	"Washington Square"	The Village Stompers
1965	Henry Mancini	"The Pink Panther Theme"	Henry Mancini
1965	Bob Florence	"The Song Is You"	Bob Florence
1965	Richard Hayman	"I Want to Hold Your Hand"	Arthur Fiedler and The Boston Pops
1965	Quincy Jones	"Golden Boy" (String Version)	Quincy Jones
1965	Anita Kerr	"Sugar Lips"	Al Hirt
1965	Hugo Montenegro	"The Long Ships"	Hugo Montenegro
1965	Billy Strayhorn	"A Spoonful of Sugar"	Duke Ellington
1966	Herb Alpert	"A Taste of Honey"	Herb Alpert and the Tijuana Brass
1966	Bob Florence	"Mission to Moscow"	Si Zentner
1966	Neal Hefti	"Girl Talk"	Neal Hefti
1966	Horst Jankowski	"Walk in the Black Forest"	Horst Jankowski
1966	Johnny Mandel	"The Shadow of Your Smile"	Robert Armbruster
1966	Jack Mason	"A Hard Day's Night"	Arthur Fiedler conducting The Boston Pops
1967	Herb Alpert	"What Now My Love"	Herb Alpert and the Tijuana Brass
1967	John Barry	"Born Free"	John Barry
1967	Bob Florence	"Michelle"	Bud Shank
1967	Neal Hefti	"Batman Theme"	Neal Hefti
1967	Henry Mancini	"Arabesque"	Henry Mancini
1968	Burt Bacharach	"Alfie"	Burt Bacharach
1968	Burt Bacharach	"Casino Royale"	Herb Alpert and The Tijuana Brass
1968	Hutch Davie	"Music to Watch Girls By"	Bob Crewe Generation
1968	Bill Holman	"Norwegian Wood"	Buddy Rich
1968	Claus Ogerman	"Wave"	Antônio Carlos Jobim
1968	Bill Reddie	"West Side Story Medley"	Buddy Rich
1969	Mike Post	"Classical Gas"	Mason Williams
1969	Al Capps	"Baroque-A-Nova"	Mason Williams
1969	Michel Legrand	"The Windmills of Your Mind"	Michel Legrand
1969	Hugo Montenegro	"The Good, the Bad and the Ugly"	Hugo Montenegro
1969	Don Sebesky	"Scarborough Fair"	Wes Montgomery

=== 1970s ===
Year^{[I]}	Nominee(s)	Work	Artist(s)
1970	Henry Mancini	"Love Theme from Romeo and Juliet"	Henry Mancini
1970	Arthur Ferrante and Lou Teicher	"Midnight Cowboy"	Ferrante & Teicher
1970	Dick Halligan	"Variations on a Theme by Eric Satie"	Blood, Sweat & Tears
1970	Quincy Jones	"Walking in Space"	Quincy Jones
1971	Henry Mancini	"Theme from Z"	Henry Mancini
1971	Miles Davis	"Bitches Brew"	Miles Davis
1971	Quincy Jones	"Gula Matari"	Quincy Jones
1971	Lalo Schifrin	"Theme from Medical Center"	Various Artists
1971	Fred Selden	"The Magic Bus Ate My Doughnut"	Don Ellis
1971	Tom Sellers	"Overture from Tommy"	The Assembled Multitude
1972	Johnny Allen and Isaac Hayes	"Theme from Shaft"	Isaac Hayes
1972	Michel Colombier	"Earth"	Michel Colombier
1972	Michel Legrand	"Theme from Summer of '42"	Michel Legrand
1972	Joshua Rifkin	"Nightingale II"	Joshua Rifkin
1972	Don Sebesky	"The Rite of Spring"	Hubert Laws
1973	Don Ellis	"Theme from The French Connection"	Don Ellis Big Band
1973	Richard Carpenter	"Flat Baroque"	The Carpenters
1973	Quincy Jones	"Money Runner"	Quincy Jones
1973	Henry Mancini	"Theme from The Mancini Generation"	Henry Mancini
1973	Don Sebesky	"Lonely Town"	Freddie Hubbard
1974	Quincy Jones	"Summer in the City"	Quincy Jones
1974	Chick Corea	"Spain"	Chick Corea and Return to Forever
1974	Lee Holdridge	"Prologue/Crunchy Granola Suite"	Neil Diamond
1974	Bill Holman	"The Daily Dance"	Stan Kenton and His Orchestra
1974	Bob James	"Easy Living/Ain't Nobody's Business If I Do"	Grover Washington Jr.
1975	Patrick Williams	"Threshold"	Patrick Williams
1975	Les Hooper	"Circumvent"	Les Hooper
1975	Les Hooper	"Look What They've Done"	Les Hooper Big Band
1975	Bob James	"Night on Bald Mountain"	Bob James
1975	Don Sebesky	"Firebird/Bird of Fire"	Don Sebesky
1976	Pete Clarence Carpenter and Mike Post	"The Rockford Files"	Mike Post
1976	Randy Brecker	"Some Skunk Funk"	Brecker Brothers
1976	Alan Broadbent	"Children of Lima"	Woody Herman
1976	Thad Jones	"Living for the City"	Thad Jones and Mel Lewis
1976	Ron McClure	"No Show"	Blood, Sweat & Tears
1976	Herbert W. Spencer	"Theme from Jaws"	John Williams
1977	Chick Corea	"Leprechaun's Dream"	Chick Corea
1977	Stanley Clarke	"Life Is Just a Game"	Stanley Clarke
1977	Bob James	"Westchester Lady"	Bob James
1977	Henry Mancini, Herbert W. Spencer, John Williams and Albert Woodbury	"The Disaster Movie Suite"	Henry Mancini conducting London Symphony
1977	Claus Ogerman	"Saudades do Brasil"	Antonio Carlos Jobim
1978	Harry Betts, Perry Botkin Jr. and Barry De Vorzon	"Nadia's Theme (The Young and the Restless)"	Barry De Vorzon
1978	Chick Corea	"Musicmagic"	Chick Corea and Return to Forever
1978	Bob James	"Scheherezade"	Hubert Laws
1978	Joe Sample	"Free as the Wind"	The Crusaders
1978	Herbert W. Spencer	"Roots Mural Theme"	Quincy Jones
1979	Robert Freedman and Quincy Jones	"The Wiz Main Title — Overture, Part One"	Various Artists
1979	Alan Broadbent	"Aja"	Woody Herman Band
1979	Chick Corea	"Mad Hatter Rhapsody"	Chick Corea
1979	Joe Roccisano	"Green Earrings"	Woody Herman Band
1979	Tom Tom 84	"Runnin'"	Earth, Wind & Fire

=== 1980s ===
Year^{[I]}	Nominee(s)	Work	Artist(s)
1980	Claus Ogerman	"Soulful Strut"	George Benson
1980	Jeremy Lubbock and Harvey Mason	"Wave"	Harvey Mason
1980	Claus Ogerman	"Lazy Afternoon"	Freddie Hubbard
1980	Don Sebesky	"Sebastian's Theme"	Don Sebesky
1980	John Serry	"Sabotage"	John Serry
1981	Jerry Hey and Quincy Jones	"Dinorah, Dinorah"	George Benson
1981	Bob Brookmeyer	"Skylark"	Mel Lewis
1981	Jorge Calandrelli	"Forget the Woman"	Eddie Daniels
1981	Dave Grusin	"Marcosinho"	Dave Valentin
1981	Claus Ogerman	"Wave"	Antônio Carlos Jobim
1982	Quincy Jones and Johnny Mandel	"Velas"	Quincy Jones
1982	Toshiko Akiyoshi	"A Bit Byas'd"	Toshiko Akiyoshi – Lew Tabackin Big Band
1982	Jerry Goldsmith	"The Slaves"	Jerry Goldsmith
1982	Dave Grusin	"Mountain Dance"	Dave Grusin
1982	Billy May	"South Rampart Street Parade"	John Williams
1983	John Williams	"Flying — Theme from E.T. the Extra-Terrestrial"	John Williams
1983	Clare Fischer, Ronnie Foster and Earl Klugh	"Balladina"	Earl Klugh
1983	Les Hooper	"Pavanne"	Les Hooper Big Band
1983	Lyle Mays and Pat Metheny	"Are You Going with Me?"	Pat Metheny Group
1983	Claus Ogerman	"Pavane Pour Une Infante Defunte"	Claus Ogerman featuring Jan Akkerman
1984	Dave Grusin	"Summer Sketches '82"	Dave Grusin
1984	Toshiko Akiyoshi	"Remembering Bud"	Toshiko Akiyoshi - Lew Tabackin Big Band
1984	Bob Florence	"Afternoon of a Prawn"	Bob Florence
1984	Rob McConnell	"I Got Rhythm"	Rob McConnell and the Boss Brass
1984	Patrick Williams	"Too Hip for the Room"	Patrick Williams
1985	Quincy Jones and Jeremy Lubbock	"Grace (Gymnastics Theme)"	Quincy Jones
1985	Stewart Copeland	"Brothers on Wheels"	Stewart Copeland
1985	Robert Freedman	"Stardust"	Wynton Marsalis
1985	Henry Mancini	"Cameo for Flute '...for James'"	James Galway and Henry Mancini
1985	Don Sebesky	"Waltz for Debbie"	Don Sebesky
1986	Dave Grusin and Lee Ritenour	"Early A.M. Attitude"	Dave Grusin and Lee Ritenour
1986	Toshiko Akiyoshi	"March of the Tadpoles"	Toshiko Akiyoshi – Lew Tabackin Big Band
1986	William David Brohn	"Suite of Dances from Pacific Overtures"	Various Artists
1986	Chip Davis	"Stille Nacht (Silent Night)"	Mannheim Steamroller
1986	George Russell	The African Game	George Russell and the Living Time Orchestra
1987	Patrick Williams	"Suite Memories"	Bill Watrous and Patrick Williams
1987	Jorge Calandrelli	"The First Letter"	Dick Hazard
1987	Jorge Calandrelli	"Solfeggietto Metamorphosis"	Eddie Daniels
1987	Bill Meyers	"AM/PM"	Bill Meyers
1987	Don Sebesky	"Cherokee"	Don Sebesky
1988	Bill Holman	"Take the "A" Train"	The Tonight Show Band with Doc Severinsen
1988	Jorge Calandrelli	"Any Time, Any Season"	Sam Most
1988	Michael Convertino	Main Title (Children of a Lesser God)"	Shirley Walker
1988	Dave Grusin	"The Heart Is a Lonely Hunter"	Dave Grusin
1988	Patrick Williams	"Jive Samba"	Patrick Williams' New York Band
1989	Roger Kellaway	"Memos from Paradise"	Eddie Daniels
1989	David Balakrishnan	"A Night in Tunisia"	Turtle Island String Quartet
1989	Bill Barber, Jimmy Johnson and Dick Oatts	"Jazz Patrol"	Flim & the BB's
1989	John Dankworth	"Caravan"	John Dankworth
1989	Henry Mancini	"Suite from The Thorn Birds"	Henry Mancini

=== 1990s ===
Year^{[I]}	Nominee(s)	Work	Artist(s)
1990	Dave Grusin	"Suite from The Milagro Beanfield War"	Dave Grusin
1990	Frank Foster	"The Count Basie Remembrance Suite"	Frank Foster
1990	Les Hooper	"Anything Goes"	Les Hooper Big Band
1990	Thad Jones	"Three in One"	Mel Lewis Jazz Orchestra
1990	Maxine Roach	"Extensions"	The Uptown String Quartet
1991	Jerry Hey, Quincy Jones, Ian Prince and Rod Temperton	"Birdland"	Quincy Jones
1991	John Clayton	"Brush This"	Clayton-Hamilton Jazz Orchestra
1991	Chick Corea	"Tale of Daring, Chapters 1-4"	Chick Corea Elektric Band
1991	Henry Mancini	"Monster Movie Music Suite"	Henry Mancini conducting the Pops Orchestra
1991	John Williams	"Born on the Fourth of July"	John Williams
1992	Dave Grusin	"Medley: Bess You Is My Woman/I Loves You Porgy"	Dave Grusin
1992	Peter Apfelbaum	"Candles and Stones"	Peter Apfelbaum and the Hieroglyphics Ensemble
1992	Mike Bogle	"Got a Match?"	University of North Texas One O'Clock Lab Band
1992	Michael Kamen	"Maid Marian"	Michael Kamen
1992	Henry Mancini	"The Untouchables"	Henry Mancini
1992	Ed Neumeister	"A Nightingale Sang in Berkeley Square"	Mel Lewis Jazz Orchestra
1993	Rob McConnell	"Strike Up the Band"	Rob McConnell and the Boss Brass
1993	Michael Abene	"Airegin"	GRP All-Star Big Band
1993	Russ Gershon	"Bennie Moten's Weird Nightmare"	Either/Orchestra
1993	Gary Lindsay	"Cherokee"	Arturo Sandoval
1993	Neil Slater	"Values"	University of North Texas One O'Clock Lab Band
1994	Dave Grusin	"Mood Indigo"	Dave Grusin
1994	Michael Abene	"Oleo"	GRP All-Star Big Band
1994	Arif Mardin	"Suite Fraternidad (1st and Second Movements)"	Vince Mendoza and Arif Mardin
1994	Vince Mendoza	"Buleria"	Vince Mendoza and Arif Mardin
1994	Lalo Schifrin	"Dizzy Gillespie Fireworks"	Lalo Schifrin
1995	Dave Grusin	"Three Cowboy Songs"	Dave Grusin
1995	Toshiko Akiyoshi	"Bebop"	Toshiko Akiyoshi Jazz Orchestra
1995	Louis Bellson	"Ellington-Strayhorn Suite"	Louis Bellson
1995	Richard Eddy and Arturo Sandoval	"A Mis Abuelos"	Arturo Sandoval
1995	Nan Schwartz Mishkin	"In the Wee Small Hours of the Morning"	John Williams and Boston Pops Orchestra
1996	Robert Farnon	"Lament"	J. J. Johnson and the Robert Farnon Orchestra
1996	Michael Abene	"Cookin' at the Continental"	GRP All-Star Big Band
1996	Jorge Calandrelli	"Atras Da Porta"	Ettore Stratta conducting The Royal Philharmonic
1996	Jorge Calandrelli	"Manha De Carnaval"	Ettore Stratta
1996	Marcus Miller	"Come Together"	Marcus Miller
1997	Michael Kamen	"An American Symphony (Mr. Holland's Opus)"	Michael Kamen
1997	Jorge Calandrelli	"Summer"	Eddie Daniels
1997	Jim McNeely	"Sing, Sing, Sing"	Carnegie Hall Jazz Band and Jon Faddis
1997	Lalo Schifrin	"Charlie Parker: The Firebird (Medley)"	Lalo Schifrin
1997	Wayne Shorter	"Children of the Night"	Wayne Shorter
1998	Bill Holman	"Straight, No Chaser"	The Bill Holman Band
1998	Michael Abene	"America"	Dave Grusin
1998	Robert Farnon	"Wild Is the Wind"	J. J. Johnson
1998	Dave Grusin	"Peter Gunn"	Dave Grusin
1998	Vince Mendoza	"Don't Talk (Put Your Head on My Shoulder)"	Vince Mendoza featuring John Abercrombie
1999	Don Sebesky	"Waltz for Debby"	Don Sebesky
1999	Bill Holman	"Moon of Manakoorah"	Bill Holman and The Netherlands Metropole Orchestra
1999	Michel Legrand	"Where or When"	Michel Legrand
1999	Rob McConnell	"What Are You Doing New Year's Eve?"	Rob McConnell and the Boss Brass
1999	Patrick Williams	"In the Still of the Night"	Patrick Williams and His Big Band

=== 2000s ===
Year^{[I]}	Nominee(s)	Work	Artist(s)
2000	Don Sebesky	"Chelsea Bridge"	Don Sebesky
2000	Jorge Calandrelli	"Chelsea Bridge"	Don Sebesky
2000	Dori Caymmi and Tom Scott	"Pink Panther"	Dori Caymmi
2000	Lalo Schifrin	"Fiesta"	Lalo Schifrin
2000	John Williams	"Stella by Starlight (from The Uninvited)"	Itzhak Perlman, John Williams and The Boston Pops Orchestra
2001	Chick Corea	"Spain for Sextet & Orchestra"	Chick Corea
2001	Jorge Calandrelli	"The Summer Knows/Estate"	Ettore Stratta and His Orchestra
2001	Gordon Goodwin	"Bach 2 Part Invention in D Minor"	Gordon Goodwin's Big Phat Band
2001	Paul McCandless	"Round Robin"	Oregon with The Moscow Tchaikovsky Symphony Orchestra
2001	Jim McNeely	"Nice Work If You Can Get It"	The Danish Radio Jazz Orchestra and Jim McNeely
2002	Béla Fleck and Edgar Meyer	"Debussy: Doctor Gradus Ad Parnassum"	Béla Fleck with Joshua Bell and Gary Hoffmann
2002	George S. Clinton and Quincy Jones	"Soul Bossa Nova"	George S. Clinton
2002	Bob Florence	"Take the "A" Train"	Bob Florence and the SWR Big Band
2002	Gonzalo Rubalcaba	"En la Orilla del Mundo (At the Edge of the World)"	Charlie Haden
2002	Lalo Schifrin	"Scheherazade Fantasy"	Lalo Schifrin
2003	Thomas Newman	"Six Feet Under Title Theme"	Thomas Newman
2003	David Balakrishnan	"You've Changed"	Turtle Island String Quartet featuring Paquito D'Rivera
2003	Bill Cunliffe	"Angel Eyes"	Alan Kaplan
2003	Carlos Franzetti	"Plaza Oscura"	Carlos Franzetti and Allison Brewster Franzetti
2003	Sammy Nestico	"Kiji Takes a Ride"	Sammy Nestico
2004	Michael Brecker and Gil Goldstein	"Timbuktu"	Michael Brecker Quindectet
2004	Jorge Calandrelli	"Oblivion"	Regina Carter
2004	John Fedchock	"Caribbean Fire Dance"	John Fedchock New York Big Band
2004	Rob McConnell	"Autumn in New York"	Rob McConnell and the SWR Big Band
2004	Jim McNeely	"Black Holes"	Renee Rosnes and the Danish Radio Big Band
2005	Slide Hampton	"Past Present & Future"	The Vanguard Jazz Orchestra
2005	Jorge Calandrelli	"Libertango"	Yo-Yo Ma
2005	Chick Corea	"The Long Passage"	Chick Corea Elektric Band
2005	Phil Kelly	"Bella Luce"	Phil Kelly and the NW Prevailing Winds
2005	Jim McNeely	"Sing, Sing, Sing"	David Liebman Big Band
2006	Gordon Goodwin	"The Incredits"	Michael Giacchino
2006	Billy Childs	"Scarborough Faire"	Billy Childs Ensemble
2006	John Clayton	"Lullaby of the Leaves"	The Clayton-Hamilton Jazz Orchestra
2006	Bill Cunliffe	"Do It Again"	Bill Cunliffe
2006	Chris Walden	"Cherokee"	The Chris Walden Big Band
2007	Chick Corea	"Three Ghouls"	Chick Corea
2007	Gil Goldstein	"Three Women"	Gil Goldstein
2007	Gordon Goodwin	"Attack of the Killer Tomatoes"	Gordon Goodwin's Big Phat Band
2007	Jim McNeely	"Up from the Skies"	The Vanguard Jazz Orchestra
2007	Patrick Williams	"Tom & Eddie"	The Henry Mancini Institute Orchestra and Big Band
2008	Vince Mendoza	"In a Silent Way"	Joe Zawinul
2008	Harry Connick Jr.	"Ash Wednesday"	Harry Connick Jr.
2008	Gordon Goodwin	"Yo Tannenbaum (from Bah, Humduck! A Looney Tunes Christmas)"	Gordon Goodwin's Big Phat Band
2008	Frank Macchia	"Black Is the Color of My True Love's Hair"	Frank Macchia and The Prague Orchestra
2008	Steve Wiest	"Besame Mucho"	Maynard Ferguson
2009	Peter Gabriel and Thomas Newman	"Define Dancing"	Thomas Newman
2009	Michael Abene	"Duke Ellington's Sound of Love"	Joe Lovano with WDR Big Band and Rundfunk Orchestra
2009	Robert E. Brookmeyer	"St. Louis Blues"	The Vanguard Jazz Orchestra
2009	Gordon Goodwin	"Yesterdays"	Gordon Goodwin's Big Phat Band featuring Art Tatum
2009	Frank Macchia	"Down in the Valley"	Frank Macchia and The Prague Orchestra

=== 2010s ===
Year^{[I]}	Nominee(s)	Work	Artist(s)
2010	Bill Cunliffe	"West Side Story Medley"	Resonance Big Band
2010	Michael Giacchino and Tim Simonec	"Up with End Credits"	Michael Giacchino
2010	Jeremy Lubbock	"Emmanuel"	Chris Botti and Lucia Micarelli
2010	Vince Mendoza	"Hope"	Jim Beard with Vince Mendoza and The Metropole Orchestra
2010	Vince Mendoza	"Slings and Arrows"	Chuck Owen and the Jazz Surge
2011	Vince Mendoza	"Carlos"	John Scofield, Vince Mendoza and Metropole Orkest
2011	Gil Goldstein	"Itsbynne Reel"	Dave Eggar
2011	Frank Macchia	"Skip to My Lou"	Frank Macchia
2011	Ted Nash	"Monet"	Jazz at Lincoln Center Orchestra
2011	Patrick Williams	"Fanfare for a New Day"	Patrick Williams, the Big Band
2012	Gordon Goodwin	"Rhapsody in Blue"	Gordon Goodwin's Big Phat Band
2012	Bob Brookmeyer	"Nasty Dance"	Vanguard Jazz Orchestra
2012	Clare Fischer	"In the Beginning"	The Clare Fischer Big Band
2012	Carlos Franzetti	"Song Without Words"	Carlos Franzetti and Allison Brewster Franzetti
2012	Peter Jensen	"All or Nothing at All"	Randy Brecker with DR Big Band
2013	Gil Evans	"How About You"	The Gil Evans Project
2013	Gordon Goodwin	"Salt Peanuts! (Mani Salado)"	Arturo Sandoval
2013	Wally Minko	"A Night in Tunisia (Actually an Entire Weekend!)"	Arturo Sandoval
2013	Bob Mintzer	"Irrequieto"	Bob Mintzer Big Band
2013	Michael Philip Mossman	"Afro-Cuban Jazz Suite for Ellington"	Bobby Sanabria Big Band
2014	Gordon Goodwin	"On Green Dolphin Street"	Gordon Goodwin's Big Phat Band
2014	Gil Goldstein	"Wild Beauty"	Brussels Jazz Orchestra featuring Joe Lovano
2014	Chuck Owen	"Side Hikes - A Ridge Away"	Chuck Owen and the Jazz Surge
2014	Kim Richmond	"Invitation"	The Kim Richmond Concert Jazz Orchestra
2014	Nan Schwartz	"Skylark"	Amy Dickson
2015	Ben Bram, Mitch Grassi, Scott Hoying, Avi Kaplan, Kirstin Maldonado and Kevin Olusola	"Daft Punk"	Pentatonix
2015	Gordon Goodwin	"Get Smart"	Gordon Goodwin's Big Phat Band
2015	Pete McGuinness	"Beautiful Dreamer"	The Pete McGuinness Jazz Orchestra
2015	Alfredo Rodriguez	"Guantanamera"	Alfredo Rodriguez
2015	Chris Walden	"Moon River"	Amy Dickson
2016	Ben Bram, Mitch Grassi, Scott Hoying, Avi Kaplan, Kirstin Maldonado and Kevin Olusola	"Dance of the Sugar Plum Fairy"	Pentatonix
2016	Paul Allen, Troy Hayes, Dwight Streets Levens, Evin Martin and J Moss	"Bruno Mars"	Vocally Challenged
2016	John Fedchock	"You and the Night and the Music"	John Fedchock New York Big Band
2016	Armand Hutton	"Do You Hear What I Hear?"	Committed
2016	Bob James	"Ghost of a Chance"	Bob James and Nathan East
2017	Jacob Collier	"You and I"	Jacob Collier
2017	John Beasley	"Ask Me Now"	John Beasley
2017	John Daversa	"Lucy in the Sky with Diamonds"	John Daversa
2017	Christian Jacob	"Linus & Lucy"	The Phil Norman Tentet
2017	Ted Nash	"We Three Kings"	Jazz at Lincoln Center Orchestra with Wynton Marsalis
2017	Sammy Nestico	"Good 'Swing' Wenceslas"	The Count Basie Orchestra
2018	John Williams	"Escapades for Alto Saxophone and Orchestra from Catch Me If You Can"	John Williams
2018	John Beasley	"Ugly Beauty/Pannonica"	John Beasley
2018	Chuck Owen	"All Hat, No Saddle"	Chuck Owen and the Jazz Surge
2018	Nate Smith	"Home Free (For Peter Joe)"	Nate Smith
2018	Chris Walden	"White Christmas"	Herb Alpert
2019	John Daversa	"Stars and Stripes Forever"	John Daversa Big Band featuring DACA Artists
2019	Alexandre Desplat	"The Shape of Water"	Alexandre Desplat
2019	Mark Kibble	"Change the World"	Take 6
2019	John Powell	"Madrid Finale"	John Powell
2019	Randy Waldman and Justin Wilson	"Batman Theme (TV)"	Randy Waldman featuring Wynton Marsalis

=== 2020s ===
Year^{[I]}	Nominee(s)	Work	Artist(s)
2020	Jacob Collier	"Moon River"	Jacob Collier
2020	Kris Bowers	"Blue Skies"	Kris Bowers
2020	Vince Mendoza	"Love, A Beautiful Force"	Vince Mendoza, Terell Stafford, Dick Oatts and the Temple University Studio Orchestra
2020	Emilio Solla	"La Novena"	The Emilio Solla Tango Jazz Orchestra
2020	John Williams	"Hedwig's Theme"	John Williams and Anne-Sophie Mutter
2021	John Beasley	"Donna Lee"	John Beasley
2021	Alvin Chea and Jarrett Johnson	"Lift Every Voice and Sing"	Jarrett Johnson featuring Alvin Chea
2021	Hildur Guðnadóttir	"Bathroom Dance"	Hildur Guðnadóttir
2021	Remy Le Boeuf	"Honeymooners"	Remy Le Boeuf's Assembly of Shadows
2021	Jeremy Levy	"Uranus: The Magician"	Jeremy Levy Jazz Orchestra
2022	Charlie Rosen and Jake Silverman	"Meta Knight's Revenge from Kirby Superstar"	The 8-Bit Big Band featuring Button Masher
2022	Emile Mosseri	"Infinite Love"	Emile Mosseri
2022	Bill O'Connell	"Chopsticks"	Richard Baratta
2022	Gabriela Quintero and Rodrigo Sanchez	"The Struggle Within"	Rodrigo y Gabriela
2022	Robin Smith	"For the Love of a Princess (from Braveheart)"	HAUSER, London Symphony Orchestra and Robin Smith
2023	John Beasley	"Scrapple from the Apple"	Magnus Lindgren, John Beasley and the SWR Big Band featuring Martin Auer
2023	Matt Cusson	"How Deep Is Your Love"	Kings Return
2023	Danny Elfman	"Main Titles (Doctor Strange in the Multiverse of Madness)"	Danny Elfman
2023	Armand Hutton	"As Days Go By (An Arrangement of the Family Matters Theme Song)"	Armand Hutton featuring Terrell Hunt and Just 6
2023	Remy Le Boeuf	"Minnesota, WI"	Remy Le Boeuf
2024	John Carter Cash, Tommy Emmanuel, Markus Illko, Janet Robin and Roberto Luis Rodriguez	"Folsom Prison Blues"	The String Revolution featuring Tommy Emmanuel
2024	Esin Aydingoz, Chris Bacon and Alana Da Fonseca	"Paint It Black"	Wednesday Addams
2024	Hilario Durán	"I Remember Mingus"	Hilario Durán and His Latin Jazz Big Band featuring Paquito D'Rivera
2024	Ludwig Göransson	"Can You Hear the Music"	Ludwig Göransson
2024	Nkosilathi Emmanuel Sibanda	"Angels We Have Heard on High"	Just 6
2025	Jacob Collier, Tori Kelly and John Legend	"Bridge Over Troubled Water"	Jacob Collier featuring John Legend and Tori Kelly
2025	Erin Bentlage, Alexander Lloyd Blake, Scott Hoying, A. J. Sealy and Amanda Taylor	"Rose Without the Thorns"	Scott Hoying featuring säje and Tonality
2025	Erin Bentlage, Sara Gazarek, Johnnaye Kendrick and Amanda Taylor	"Silent Night"	säje
2025	Béla Fleck and Ferde Grofé	"Rhapsody in Blue(grass)"	Béla Fleck featuring Michael Cleveland, Sierra Hull, Justin Moses, Mark Schatz and Bryan Sutton
2025	Michael League	"Baby Elephant Walk — Encore"	Snarky Puppy
2026	Bryan Carter, Charlie Rosen and Matthew Whitaker	"Super Mario Praise Break"	The 8-Bit Big Band
2026	Andy Clausen, Addison Maye-Saxon, Riley Mulherkar and Chloe Rowlands	"Fight On"	The Westerlies
2026	Cynthia Erivo	"Be Okay"	Cynthia Erivo
2026	Remy Le Boeuf	"A Child Is Born"	Nordkraft Big Band and Remy Le Boeuf
2027
2027	Ben Bram and Blake Farfan	"Blackbird"	New York Vocal Collective
2027	Ben Wendel	"Olha Maria"	Ben Wendel
2027	Chick Corea	"Overjoyed (Live)"	Chick Corea
2027	John Powell	"Radio Newsreel"	John Powell
2027	Michael Mayo	"Sir Duke"	Kings Return

== Multiple wins ==
6 wins

- Dave Grusin
- Quincy Jones

4 wins

- Henry Mancini

3 wins

- Jacob Collier
- Gordon Goodwin

2 wins

- Herb Alpert
- John Beasley
- Ben Bram
- Chick Corea
- Mitch Grassi
- Jerry Hey
- Bill Holman
- Scott Hoying
- Avi Kaplan
- Kirstin Maldonado
- Vince Mendoza
- Thomas Newman
- Kevin Olusola
- Mike Post
- Charlie Rosen
- Don Sebesky
- John Williams
- Patrick Williams

== Multiple nominations ==
13 nominations

- Quincy Jones

11 nominations

- Jorge Calandrelli
- Henry Mancini

10 nominations

- Dave Grusin

9 nominations

- Gordon Goodwin
- Don Sebesky

8 nominations

- Chick Corea

7 nominations

- Vince Mendoza
- Claus Ogerman
- Patrick Williams

6 nominations

- John Williams

5 nominations

- Michael Abene
- Bob Florence
- Bill Holman
- Bob James
- Jim McNeely
- Lalo Schifrin

4 nominations

- Toshiko Akiyoshi
- John Beasley
- Gil Goldstein
- Les Hooper
- Rob McConnell

3 nominations

- Jacob Collier
- Bill Cunliffe
- Robert Farnon
- Scott Hoying
- Avi Kaplan
- Remy Le Boeuf
- Michel Legrand
- Jeremy Lubbock
- Frank Macchia
- Herbert W. Spencer
- Chris Walden

2 nominations

- Herb Alpert
- Burt Bacharach
- David Balakrishnan
- Erin Bentlage
- Ben Bram
- Alan Broadbent
- Bob Brookmeyer
- John Clayton
- John Daversa
- John Fedchock
- Clare Fischer
- Béla Fleck
- Carlos Franzetti
- Robert Freedman
- Mitch Grassi
- Neal Hefti
- Jerry Hey
- Armand Hutton
- Thad Jones
- Michael Kamen
- Kirstin Maldonado
- Johnny Mandel
- Hugo Montenegro
- Ted Nash
- Sammy Nestico
- Thomas Newman
- Kevin Olusola
- Chuck Owen
- Mike Post
- Charlie Rosen
- Nan Schwartz
- Amanda Taylor
- Chris Walden
