= Franzetti =

Franzetti is a surname of Italian origin. Notable people with the surname include:

- Alessandro Franzetti (born 1991), Italian paralympic rower
- Allison Brewster Franzetti, American pianist and music educator, wife of Carlos
- Carlos Franzetti (born 1948), Argentinian composer and arranger
