= If You Ever Leave Me =

If You Ever Leave Me may refer to:

- If You Ever Leave Me (album), a 1968 album by Jack Jones
- If You Ever Leave Me (Jack Jones song), 1968
- If You Ever Leave Me (Barbra Streisand and Vince Gill song), 1999
