= Rusty Higgins =

American jazz musician

- Born: David B. Higgins; January 6, 1950 (age 76); Akron, Ohio, U.S.
- Education: Kent State University
- Occupations: Music master; saxophonist; arranger; composer; session musician
- Years active: 1969-present
- Spouse: Georgia Higgins

Rusty Higgins is an American music master, saxophonist, arranger, composer, and session musician. As a member of the Bob Florence Limited Edition, Higgins won the Grammy Award in 2000 for Best Large Jazz Ensemble Album for Serendipity 18. Based in Los Angeles, Higgins has performed with Frank Sinatra, Sammy Davis Jr., Aretha Franklin, Ralph Carmichael, Les Brown, and Toni Tennille.

== Early life ==
Higgins was born in Akron, Ohio, and attended Cuyahoga Falls High School in Cuyahoga Falls, Ohio, and graduated in 1967. He went to Kent State University to pursue a major in Bassoon Performance. He then traveled with many different bands for five years before moving to Los Angeles, where he has served as a woodwind doubler (saxophone, clarinet, flute) for 39 years. His primary experiences include extensive recording studio, theater, and jazz concert work. He has conducted master classes, clinics, and jazz workshops at high schools throughout California and Ohio, Kent State University, and the Shanghai Conservatory of Music.

== Career ==
Higgins was a featured sax soloist with Les Brown's Band of Renown. He joined Captain & Tennille in 1979 and served as Toni Tennille's symphony orchestra conductor beginning in 1984, conducting more than 70 orchestras. He played for both of President Reagan's presidential inaugural balls. He has also worked with Gordon Goodwin's Big Phat Band, Louis Bellson, Clark Terry, Ray Anthony, Toshiko Akiyoshi, Bill Holman, Tom Kubis, Wayne Bergeron, Nelson Riddle, Jack Sheldon, Ray Charles, Buddy Miles, and the L.A. Rams Band. Higgins has recorded or performed with Barbra Streisand, Tony Bennett, Mel Tormé, Natalie Cole, Rosemary Clooney, Sting, Kenny G, Arturo Sandoval, Michael Buble, Michael Feinstein, the Temptations, Diana Ross, Manhattan Transfer, Stevie Wonder, Johnny Cash, and Avenged Sevenfold.

Higgins has been teaching saxophone at Azusa Pacific University since 2002. He directs the Azusa Pacific Jazz Ensemble No. 2 and teaches a course in woodwind techniques. He owns and manages his own store, Long Beach Woodwinds.
