= Signs of Life =

Signs of Life may refer to:

== Film ==
- Signs of Life (1968 film), by Werner Herzog
- Signs of Life (1989 film), a U.S. film

== Literature ==
- Signs of Life (Harrison novel), a 1997 novel by M. John Harrison
- Signs of Life (Elliott novel), a 1981 novel by Sumner Locke Elliott
- Signs of Life, a 1977 book of poetry by John Gierach
- Signs of Life, a 1996 novel by Cherry Wilder

== Music ==
- Signs of Life (Billy Squier album), 1984
- "Signs of Life" (instrumental), by Pink Floyd
- Signs of Life (Penguin Cafe Orchestra album), 1987
- Signs of Life (Poets of the Fall album), 2005
- Signs of Life (Steven Curtis Chapman album), 1996
- Signs of Life (Peter Bernstein album), 1995
- Signs of Life (Peter Apfelbaum album), 1991
- Signs of Life (Tara MacLean EP), 2007
- Signs of Life by Arcade Fire, 2017
- Signs of Life, a 1998 album by Martin Carthy
- Signs of Life, an EP by Every Move a Picture
- Signs of Life, a 2004 album by Nemo
- Signs of Life, an album by Beaten by Them

== See also ==
- Vital signs
