= Tom Brantley =

American trombonist (born 1970)

- Born: 1970 (age 55–56); Louisiana, U.S.

Academic background
- Education: University of Southern Mississippi (BM); University of North Texas (MM)

Academic work
- Discipline: Music
- Sub-discipline: Trombone performance
- Notable students: Robert U. Griffin

Tom Brantley (born 1970) is an American trombonist and academic.

== Early life and education ==
Brantley was born in 1970 in Louisiana. He is a third-generation trombonist. Brantley earned music degrees from the University of Southern Mississippi (BM) and the University of North Texas (MM). He majored in trombone performance at both schools. Brantley was taught by Neil Slater.

== Career ==
Brantley joined the chamber ensemble Rhythm & Brass in 1995 and continues to tour and record with the group. He appears on many Rhythm & Brass recordings, including Ellington Explorations (1998), which upon release was named the New York Times Album of the Week, Sitting in An English Garden (2001), and Inside the Blue Suitcase (2005). He also records with the chamber group Confluences, and their self-titled debut CD appeared in 2004.

Brantley's first solo CD project, entitled Boneyard, was released on the Summit Records label. Reviews of the CD Boneyard include the Jazz Society of Oregon as well as JazzReview.com magazine. Other reviews include Bill Milkowski's in JazzTimes magazine and Ken Dryden of AllMusic.

The Brass Herald, the UK journal devoted to brass music, published a review of Boneyard (May 2009), as well as a feature article about Brantley (October 2009).

Brantley has published two different trombone etude books with Carl Fischer Music. Student's Essential Studies for Trombone includes 42 etudes taken from the various collections publishing by Carl Fischer. Stylistic Etudes for Trombone includes 20 original compositions by Tom Brantley, designed to help students master various styles required of a trombone player in a variety of performance settings.

Brantley serves as Director of Jazz Studies and Professor of Trombone at the University of South Florida in Tampa. He is an occasional reviewer for many publications on topics of interest to trombonists and other brass musicians. Brantley performs on Yamaha trombones and has offered podcasts through the Yamaha Artists series. Brantley appeared as a featured artist on the 2009 Clearwater Jazz Holiday program. He has also served as a member of the faculty for the 2007 International Trombone Festival as well as the 2011 International Trombone Festival.
