= Serendipity 18 =

Studio album by The Bob Florence Limited Edition
- Released: February 9, 1999
- Recorded: August 27 and 28, 1998
- Studio: Mad Hatter Studios
- Genre: Jazz, big band
- Length: 73:07
- Label: MAMA
- Producer: Bob Florence

Bob Florence chronology
Earth (1997)	Serendipity 18 (1999)	Another Side (2001)

Professional ratings
Review scores
Source	Rating
The Penguin Guide to Jazz Recordings	3.5/4 stars

Serendipity 18 is an album by the Bob Florence Limited Edition that won the Grammy Award for Best Large Jazz Ensemble Album in 2000.

== Track listing ==
All tracks are written by Bob Florence except where noted.

No.	Title	Length
1.	"Serendipity 18"	9:24
2.	"Sugar" (Stanley Turrentine)	7:52
3.	"Tres Palabras" (Osvaldo Farrés, Ray Gilbert)	10:31
4.	"Now Playing"	9:38
5.	"Bimbosity"	8:47
6.	"Evelyn"	7:55
7.	"E-Motions, Pt. 1"	6:27
8.	"E-Motions, Pt. 2"	8:07
9.	"E-Motions, Pt. 3"	4:26

== Personnel ==
- Bob Florence – conductor, arranger, piano
- Don Shelton – alto and soprano saxophone, flute, clarinet
- Kim Richmond – alto saxophone, flute, clarinet
- Jeff Driskill – tenor saxophone, flute, clarinet
- Terry Harrington – tenor saxophone, flute, clarinet
- Bob Carr – baritone saxophone, contra-alto clarinet
- Bob Efford – baritone saxophone, bass clarinet
- Wayne Bergeron, Carl Saunders, Rick Baptist, George Graham, Steve Huffsteter, Ron Stout – trumpet
- Alex Iles – trombone
- Charlie Loper – trombone
- Bob McChesney – trombone
- Don Waldrop – bass trombone
- Trey Henry – bass
- Dick Weller – drums

Production

- Bob Florence – producer
- Douglas Evans – executive producer, associate producer
- Gene Czerwinski – executive producer
- Rusty Higgins – associate producer
- Don Murray – engineer
- Casey Stone, Dale Lanton, David Cee – assistant engineer
- Rich Breen – mixing, mastering
- Kirk Silsbee – liner notes
