= If You Ever Leave Me (Jack Jones song) =

- A-side of the single

Single by Jack Jones

from the album If You Ever Leave Me
- B-side: "Pretty"
- Released: January 1968
- Recorded: Late 1967
- Genre: Pop; Easy listening
- Length: 2:37
- Label: RCA Victor; 47-9441
- Songwriters: Tony Hatch; Jackie Trent
- Producer: Ernie Altschuler

Jack Jones singles chronology
| "Oh How Much I Love You (Dio Come Ti Amo)" (1967) | "If You Ever Leave Me" (1968) | "The Gypsies, the Jugglers, and the Clowns" (1968) |

Professional ratings
Review scores
| Source | Rating |
|---|---|
| Record World | 4/5 stars |
| Billboard | Positive (Spotlight) |

"If You Ever Leave Me" is a song written by British songwriting duo Tony Hatch and Jackie Trent, and most notably performed by American singer Jack Jones, who released it as a single at the start of 1968.

== Jack Jones version ==
=== Background ===
By 1968 Jones' chart performance had waned, and the main chart he had success with, was the Adult Contemporary chart. The new single followed a period of declining pop chart performance for Jones, but unlike most previous singles, completely missed the Cashbox charts. "If You Ever Leave Me" was the first of eight singles that he released that year. It was produced by Ernie Altschuler and arranged by Marty Paich, like on his previous single "Live For Life". A month later it was featured on his 1968 album, If You Ever leave Me. Notably, it was his second single release for RCA Victor, which he started recording for in 1967, although he would still record for Kapp Records at the same time for a few years.

=== Release and reception ===
"If You Ever Leave Me" was released as a seven-inch single in January 1968 by RCA Victor Records. It was backed by another easy listening song written by duo Florence and Allen, simply titled "Pretty" on the B-side, which would be included on the same LP as "If You Ever Leave Me".

The single received a positive critical reception. Record World put the single in its "Four Stars" singles section, saying that it is "Strong ballad material", noting that "Jack reads it with compelling voice and manner". Billboard magazine reviewed the single on February 3, 1968, writing "Tony Hatch-Jackie Trent ballad material is beautifully interpreted by Jones with a top Marty Paich arrangement."

=== Chart performance ===
The track debuted on the Billboard Hot 100 on February 17, 1968, remaining on the chart for two weeks with a peak position of number 92. It became his last entry on the chart. "If You Ever Leave Me" was ranked higher on the Billboard Easy Listening survey, reaching number 5 during a seven-week run on it. On the Record World Up-Coming Singles chart the track peaked at number 107, but was ranked on their Top-Non Rock survey as well, reaching number 3.

=== Track listing ===
7" single (RCA Victor 47-9441, 1968)
| No. | Title | Writer(s) | Length |
|---|---|---|---|
| 1. | "If You Ever Leave Me" | Tony Hatch; Jackie Trent | 2:37 |
| 2. | "Pretty" | Bob Florence; Gail Allen | 2:24 |

== Charts ==
Chart performance for "If You Ever Leave Me"
| Chart (1968) | Peak position |
|---|---|
| US Billboard Hot 100 | 92 |
| US Billboard Easy Listening | 5 |
| US Record World Up-Coming Singles | 107 |
| US Record World Top Non-Rock | 3 |
