= Michelle (album) =

Studio album by Bud Shank
- Released: 1966
- Recorded: October 1966; Los Angeles, California
- Genre: Jazz
- Label: World Pacific; WP 1840
- Producer: Richard Bock

Bud Shank chronology
California Dreamin' (1966)	Michelle (1966)	Girl in Love (1966)

Michelle is an album by saxophonist Bud Shank recorded in 1966 for the World Pacific label.

== Reception ==
Professional ratings
Review scores
Source	Rating
AllMusic	1/5 stars

AllMusic rated the album with 5 star.

== Track listing ==
1. "Michelle" (John Lennon, Paul McCartney) - 2:25
2. "Petite Fleur (Little Flower)" (Sidney Bechet) - 2:37
3. "Girl" (Lennon, McCartney) - 2:23
4. "As Tears Go By" (Mick Jagger, Keith Richards, Andrew Loog Oldham) - 2:10
5. "You Didn't Have to Be So Nice" (Steve Boone, John Sebastian) - 2:25
6. "Love Theme, Umbrellas of Cherbourg (I'll Wait for You)" (Michel Legrand, Norman Gimbel) - 2:27
7. "Sounds of Silence" (Paul Simon) - 2:34
8. "Turn! Turn! Turn! (To Everything There Is a Season)" (Pete Seeger) - 2:40
9. "Yesterday" (Lennon, McCartney) - 2:38
10. "Blue on Blue" (Burt Bacharach, Hal David) - 2:19

== Personnel ==
- Bud Shank - alto saxophone, flute
- Chet Baker - flugelhorn
- Unidentified orchestra arranged and conducted by Bob Florence
