= Bud Shank & His Brazilian Friends =

Studio album by Bud Shank and João Donato
- Released: 1965
- Recorded: 1965; Los Angeles, CA
- Genre: Jazz
- Label: Pacific Jazz; PJ 89
- Producer: Richard Bock

Bud Shank chronology
All Through the Night: Julie London Sings the Choicest of Cole Porter (1965)	Bud Shank & His Brazilian Friends (1965)	California Dreamin' (1966)

Bud Shank & His Brazilian Friends is an album by saxophonist Bud Shank with pianist/composer João Donato released on the Pacific Jazz label.

== Reception ==
Professional ratings
Review scores
Source	Rating
AllMusic	3/5 stars

AllMusic rated the album with 3 stars.

== Track listing ==
All compositions by João Donato, except as indicated

1. "Sausalito" - 3:53
2. "Minha Saudade" (João Donato, João Gilberto) - 3:31
3. "Samba do Avião" (Antônio Carlos Jobim) - 3:03
4. "It Was Night" (Jobim, Newton Mendonça) - 3:12
5. "Silk Stop" - 2:41
6. "Caminho de Casa" - 3:20
7. "Um Abraco no Bonfa" (Stan Getz, Gilberto) - 3:15
8. "Once I Loved" (Jobim, Vinicius de Moraes) - 4:09
9. "Sambou ...Sambou" (Donato, João Mello) - 3:10
10. "Tristesa em Mim" (Mauro Tavares, José Gulmaraes) - 3:16

== Personnel ==
- Bud Shank - alto saxophone
- João Donato - piano
- Rosinha de Valença - guitar
- Sebastião Neto - bass
- Chico Batera - drums
