= California Dreamin' (Bud Shank album) =

Studio album by Bud Shank
- Released: 1966
- Recorded: August 1966; Los Angeles, California
- Genre: Jazz
- Label: World Pacific; WP 1845
- Producer: Richard Bock

Bud Shank chronology
Bud Shank & His Brazilian Friends (1965)	California Dreamin' (1966)	Michelle (1966)

California Dreamin' is an album by saxophonist Bud Shank recorded in 1966 for the World Pacific label.

== Reception ==
Professional ratings
Review scores
Source	Rating
AllMusic	3/5 stars

AllMusic rated the album with 3 stars.

== Track listing ==
1. "California Dreamin'" (John Phillips, Michelle Phillips) - 2:31
2. "Imprevu" (Johnny Richards, Lois Geraci) - 2:55
3. "Listen People" (Graham Gouldman) - 2:28
4. "What the World Needs Now Is Love" (Burt Bacharach, Hal David) - 2:50
5. "In Times Like These" (Bacharach, David) - 3:02
6. "Norwegian Wood (This Bird Has Flown)" (John Lennon, Paul McCartney) - 2:39
7. "Woman" (Bernard Webb) - 2:24
8. "Monday, Monday" (John Phillips) - 2:55
9. "Daydream" (John Sebastian) - 3:02
10. "Gotta Go" (Marty Paich, Rod McKuen) - 2:53
11. "The End of the World" (Arthur Kent, Sylvia Dee) - 2:53
12. "Husbands & Wives" (Roger Miller) - 3:10

== Personnel ==
- Bud Shank - alto saxophone, flute
- Chet Baker - flugelhorn
- Unidentified orchestra arranged and conducted by Bob Florence
