= Kim Richmond =

American jazz saxophonist and arranger (1940–2024)

- Born: July 24, 1940
- Died: September 20, 2024 (aged 84)

Kim Richmond (July 24, 1940 – September 20, 2024) was an American jazz saxophonist and arranger.

== Life and career ==
Richmond was born in Champaign, Illinois, on July 24, 1940. He played piano, clarinet, and saxophone when young, and made his professional debut in 1956. He studied at the University of Illinois in the early 1960s. He played in the U.S. Air Force big band, the Airmen of Note, while serving from 1963–67 in Washington D.C. He then moved to California and played with Stan Kenton (1967), Clare Fischer (1968), Louie Bellson (1969–72), Lalo Schifrin (1979), Bob Florence (1979), Les Brown (1989), Bill Holman (1990), Vinny Golia (1991), Johnny Mandel, Chris Walden, and Clay Jenkins.

Richmond arranged professionally from the 1960s, for Schifrin, Buddy Rich, and Ernie Watts . He founded the Kim Richmond Concert Jazz Orchestra in southern California to perform his works. Additionally, he has worked as a session musician, arranger, director, and conductor for studios and popular musicians.

Richmond died from bladder cancer at Cedars-Sinai Medical Center on September 20, 2024, at the age of 84.

== Discography ==
=== As leader ===
- Looking In Looking Out (USA, 1990)
- Passages (Sea Breeze, 1992)
- Range (Nine Winds, 1994)
- Look at the Time (Chase, 1999)
- Ballads (Chase, 2001)
- Refractions (Origin, 2003)
- CrossWeave (Origin, 2004)
- Live at Cafe Metropol (Origin, 2007)
- Artistry (MAMA, 2013)

=== As sideman ===
With Mike Barone

- Live 2005! (Rhubarb, 2005)
- Metropole (Rhubarb, 2006)
- By Request (Rhubarb, 2007)

With Bob Florence

- Live at Concerts by the Sea (Trend, 1980)
- Westlake (Discovery, 1981)
- Soaring (Bosco, 1983)
- Magic Time (Trend, 1984)
- Trash Can City (Trend, 1987)
- State of the Art (USA, 1988)
- Treasure Chest (USA, 1990)
- Funupsmanship (MAMA, 1993)
- With All the Bells and Whistles (MAMA, 1995)
- Earth (MAMA, 1997)
- Serendipity 18 (MAMA, 1998)
- Whatever Bubbles Up (Summit, 2003)
- Eternal Licks & Grooves (MAMA, 2007)
- Legendary (MAMA, 2009)

With Vinny Golia

- Commemoration (Nine Winds, 1994)
- Portland 1996 (Nine Winds, 1997)
- The Other Bridge (Nine Winds, 2000)

With John LaBarbera

- On the Wild Side (Jazz Compass, 2003)
- Fantazm (Jazz Compass, 2005)
- Caravan (Jazz Compass, 2013)

With others

- Paul Anka, Classic Songs My Way (Universal, 2007)
- Gordon Brisker, New Beginning (Discovery, 1987)
- Dr. John, Afterglow (Blue Thumb, 1995)
- Clare Fischer, Thesaurus (Atlantic, 1969)
- Clare Fischer, Waltz (Discovery, 1988)
- Buddy Greco, Hot Nights (Applause, 1982)
- Buddy Greco, Ready for Your Love (Bainbridge, 1984)
- Les Hooper, Raisin' the Roof (Jazz Hounds, 1982)
- Stan Kenton, The Jazz Compositions of Dee Barton (Capitol, 1968)
- Sammy Nestico, Big Band Favorites of Sammy Nestico (Summit, 1998)
- John Rapson, Bing (Sound Aspects 1990)
- John Rapson, Water and Blood (Nine Winds, 2001)
- Lalo Schifrin, No One Home (Tabu, 1979)
- Chris Walden, No Bounds (Origin, 2006)
- Chris Walden, Full-On! (Origin, 2014)
- Bill Watrous/Pete Christlieb, Kindred Spirits (Summit, 2006)
- Bill Watrous/Pete Christlieb, A Beautiful Friendship (Summit, 2014)
- Phil Woods, Unheard Herd (Jazzed Media, 2003)
- Neil Young, Storytone (Reprise, 2014)
