= Neil Slater =

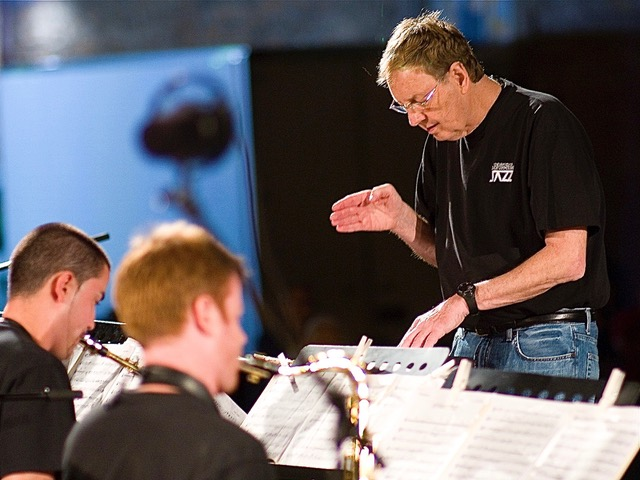
- (L–R) Michel Machietto (alto sax), Isaac Lamar (tenor sax), Neil Slater conducting the One O'Clock Lab Band at the Umbria Jazz Festival, July 18, 2008

Background information
- Born: Kenneth Neil Slater; July 3, 1931 (age 95); Turtle Creek, Pennsylvania, U.S.
- Genres: Jazz, contemporary classical
- Occupations: Musician, composer, teacher
- Instrument: Piano
- Website: neilslater.com

Kenneth Neil Slater (born July 3, 1931) is an American educator, composer, and pianist. In 2008, he retired as professor emeritus. He has composed over 80 works for jazz ensemble and has written for symphony, chamber groups, a cappella choir, opera, and musical theatre.

== Career ==
=== Early years ===
Slater was born in July 1931 in Turtle Creek, Pennsylvania, a suburb of Pittsburgh. Beginning at age six, he learned piano from a friend of his parents. In 1952 he graduated from Mansfield University of Pennsylvania. Two years later he received a master's degree in composition from Duquesne University in Pittsburgh. Beginning in 1960, he took night classes for about two years at Teachers College, Columbia University, studying pedagogy, piano, and composition.

From 1954 to 1956, Slater served in the U.S. Army, spending most of his time with the 97^{th} Army Band at Fort Sill as a pianist but also playing French horn and valve trombone. He backed guest stars in shows produced by Daniel Melnick of the Music and Entertainment Section of Special Services. One such show featured vocalist Peggy King, who entertained the troops at Fort Sill in 1956. (Note: "TV's Peggy King to Perform Here," The Cannoneer (official weekly newspaper of Fort Sill), Vol. 13, No. 2, January 19, 1956 (front page)) (Note: "Perky Peggy King Ends Two Day Visit," The Cannoneer (official weekly newspaper of Fort Sill), Vol. 13, No. 3, January 26, 1956, p. 2) Slater also directed a weekly television show from Fort Sill. Gary McFarland was among the musicians.

=== Teaching and composing ===
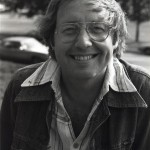
Neil Slater (1980)

Slater's first teaching job, from 1956 to about 1960, was with the Mount Vernon City Schools, where he traveled to a different school each day of the week, covering five schools, to introduce elementary school students to their first instruments. Jazz drummer Alvin Queen, when he was in elementary school, started studying drums with Slater, who, at the time, taught all the band instruments. (Note: "Alvin Queen, 'The Monster'" by Elaine Bissell, (née Faulkner; 1917–2013), Westchester Weekend, the magazine of the Herald Statesman, September 14, 1979) (Note: "Jazz Concert," Herald Statesman (Yonkers, New York), December 12, 1980, p. 17 (retrieved August 25, 2016, via www.fultonhistory.com)) In 1965 he co-founded the Westchester Stage Band Clinics. (Note: "Pelham Plans Band Clinic," Daily News (Tarrytown, New York), March 10, 1965, p. 24)

In 1968, he became Director of Bands at Mamaroneck High School. (Note: "Four Newcomers Join Music Staff at Muskingum," Times Recorder (Zanesville, Ohio), August 25, 1968, p. 2 (retrieved via www.newspapers.com/clip/78727836)) Two years later he joined the music faculty at the University of Bridgeport. In 1970, he was appointed Slater as Assistant Professor of Music with the Jazz and Composition Faculty, Department of Music, College of Education. (Note: "Jazz Composer Named to UB Music Faculty," Bridgeport Post, July 19, 1970, p. 5 (retrieved August 15, 2016, via www.newspapers.com)) Bridgeport's expansion in jazz was influenced in part by a new emphasis placed on jazz curriculum at the National Association for Music Education conference that was held March 1970 in Chicago. Slater founded the jazz program in 1971 at the University of Bridgeport. For 11 years, Slater directed the University of Bridgeport Jazz Ensemble. He also served as coordinator of UB's Jazz Studio Program. He hired Bill Finegan to teach composing and arranging and Finnegan's wife Rosemary to teach singing. Slater also hired Sal Salvador, Art Davis, Randy Jones. The UB Jazz Ensemble performed with Bill Watrous, Gerry Mulligan, and Chet Baker.

Slater became Director of Jazz Studies, and in 1976 the school established a bachelor's degree in jazz studies. (Note: "Jazz Group To Perform," Observer-Dispatch (Utica, New York), March 30, 1981, p. 11 (retrieved August 25, 2016, via www.fultonhistory.com)) By 1981, his compositions had been performed by Stan Kenton, Slide Hampton, Clark Terry, Sal Salvador, Joe Morello, and Bobby Shew. The press credited Slater as having performed with Frank Strozier, Louis Hayes, Don Elliott, Jimmy Heath, Frank Foster, Danny Stiles, Art Davis, Bill Watrous, Joe Morello, and Sal Salvador. Slater had been under contract with MCA and Warner Bros. as a composer, arranger and consultant.

He frequently performed as a featured guest piano soloist with other college jazz ensembles. In one instance, Slater was a guest pianist at the Memphis State University Jazz Week '77.

=== Jazz Studies at North Texas ===
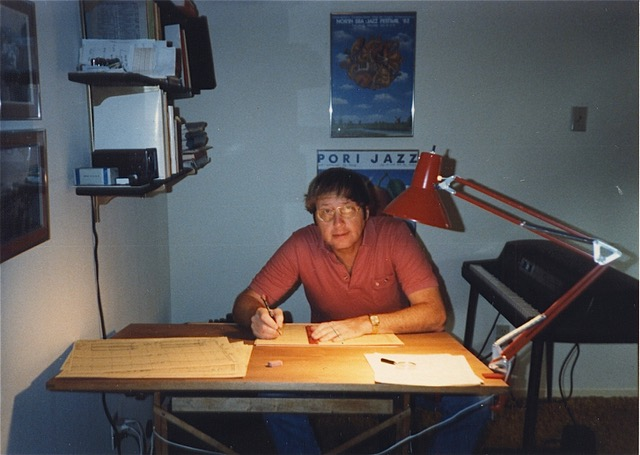
Slater in Denton, Texas (1982)

From 1981 to 2008, Slater was Chair of Jazz Studies and director of the One O'Clock Lab Band at the University of North Texas College of Music. (Note: "Noted Jazzman To Take NTSU Post" (UPI), Dallas Morning News, July 3, 1981, p. 40A) In 1946, North Texas became the first college to offer a degree in jazz studies. Slater was the first to head the program whose role as a composer and arranger represented a significant part of his career. Slater is credited for having emphasized small jazz combos. In 1982, he established the College of Music Jazz Lecture Series. In 1983, he started the Master of Music with a Major in Jazz Studies. In 1994, with funding from the school's college of business, he established the artist-in-residence series. He also integrated jazz studies classes with the lab band experience. Under Slater's direction, the One O'Clock band made 29 studio albums, six live recordings, and one compilation commemorating 50 years of jazz at North Texas. Slater directed the band on tours throughout the world to Pori Jazz Festival, North Sea Jazz Festival, Montreux Jazz Festival, Antibes Jazz Festival, and the Molde Jazz Festival.

King of Thailand, Bhumibol Adulyadej, which lasted four hours, and sat in with the band. The band's performance marked a 37-year reunion. In 1967, the One O'Clock band performed at a White House State Dinner hosted by President Lyndon Johnson for the king and queen of Thailand. (Note: "Home Grown Shows Planned for White House Dinners," New York Times, May 30, 1967) During the performance, Duke Ellington sat-in with the band, playing "Take the A Train". (Note: "NTSU Acquires Duke Ellington Lore," Dallas Morning News, September 11, 1968)

While in New York City, he maintained an active role as a composer, arranger, pianist, and educator. He was active in big bands, jazz combos, andstudio work ranging for jazz, R&B, pop, and jingles. In the 1970s, Slater arranged choral works by John Denver and Natalie Cole. He was hired by MCA to consult, compose, and arrange. His work included choral arrangements of Moody Blues hits. In 1972, Warner Bros. contracted Slater as a consultant to compose and arrange. His choral arrangements include "Theme from Summer of '42" and "Everybody Gets to Go to the Moon".

== Awards and honors ==
Slater was nominated for a Grammy Award for Best Arrangement on an Instrumental for his arrangement of "Values," which he also composed. "Values" was on the album Lab 91 performed by the One O'Clock band directed and co-produced by Slater.

Slater is also a two-time Grammy nominee participant. The first was in 1989 for a work by Mike Bogle who was nominated for Best Arrangement on an Instrumental for his arrangement "Got a Match? by Chick Corea – on Lab '89, performed by the One O'Clock – directed and co-produced by Slater. The second was in 2009 for contributing two works, "Another Other" and "Time Sensitive" – both composed and arranged by Slater – on Lab 2009, which, as an album, received a Grammy nomination for Best Large Jazz Ensemble Album.

U.S. News & World Report ranked the North Texas jazz studies program as the best in the country every year from 1994, when it began ranking graduate jazz programs, to 1997, when it retired the category.

- 1985 Outstanding Service to Jazz Education, NAJE
- 1987–2013 Standard Award, recipient 26 consecutive years (ASCAP)
- 1996 President's Award, University of North Texas
- 2008 United States Congressional citation for Outstanding Career
- 2016 Neil Slater Day declared by the mayor of Bridgeport

== Discography ==
- Neil Slater Trio (York, 1963)
- Lew Anderson Big Band Live (1974)
- Parallelogram, Sal Salvador (GP, 1978)
- Lab '82: European Tour Live at Montreaux (1982)
- Lab '83
- Lab '84
- Lab '85
- Lab '86
- With Respect to Stan (1986)
- Lab '87
- Live In Australia – The 1986 Tour (1987)
- Lab '88
- Lab '89
- Lab '90
- Lab '91
- Lab '92
- Lab '93
- Lab '94
- One O'Clock Standard Time: Remembering Gene Hall (1994)
- Lab '95
- Lab '96
- Lab '97
- Lab '98
- Lab '99
- Kenny Wheeler at North Texas (2000)
- Lab 2000
- Lab 2001
- Lab 2002
- Lab 2003
- Lab 2004
- Live from Thailand (2004)
- Midwest Clinic (Mark, 2004)
- Lab 2005
- Lab 2006
- Lab 2007
- Lab 2008
- Lab 2009
- Lab 2010
- Lab 2011
- Lab 2012
- Lab 2013
