= Chris Walden Big Band =

American jazz band

- Origin: Los Angeles, California
- Genres: Jazz, big band
- Years active: 1999–present
- Label: Origin
- Members: Chris Walden, Leader; Jeff Driskill, Lead Alto Saxophone; Kim Richmond, Alto Saxophone; Rob Lockart, Tenor Saxophone; Brandon Fields, Tenor Saxophone; Tom Peterson, Baritone Saxophone; Wayne Bergeron, Lead Trumpet; Kye Palmer, Trumpet; Ron King, Trumpet; Kevin Richardson, Trumpet; Bob McChesney, Trombone; Alex Iles, Trombone; Arturo Velasco, Trombone; Rich Bullock, Bass Trombone; Mitch Holder, Guitar; Alan Steinberger, Piano; Kenny Wild, Bass; Ray Brinker, Drums
- Website: www.chriswalden.com

The Chris Walden Big Band is a Grammy-nominated 18-piece jazz big band based in Los Angeles, California, founded in 1999 by German composer and arranger Chris Walden. The band consists of Los Angeles–based studio musicians who suggested to Walden he should form his own band, after having played his music for various projects in studios.

The band exclusively plays Walden's own material, which consists of his own compositions or his contemporary arrangements of jazz tunes or film themes. Vocalists who have appeared frequently with the Chris Walden Big Band are Tierney Sutton, Carol Welsman, and Courtney Fortune. The band frequently plays in and around Los Angeles.

== Discography ==
- Chris Walden Big Band – Home Of My Heart (2005)
- Chris Walden Big Band – No Bounds (2006)
- Chris Walden Big Band & St. John's Choir – Kurt Marti Suite (2007)
- Chris Walden Big Band – "Full-On!" (2014)

== Awards and nominations ==
2005 Grammy Award nominations:

- Best Large Jazz Ensemble Album – Home Of My Heart
- Best Instrumental Arrangement – Cherokee from Home Of My Heart

== Sources ==
- Jack Behrens, Big Bands & Great Ballrooms ISBN 1-4259-6977-1
