= Frank Macchia =

American composer, arranger, and musician

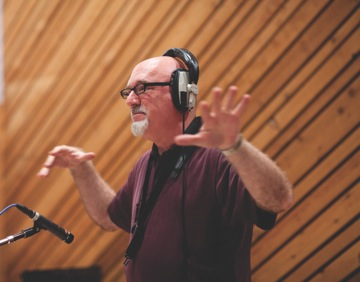
Frank Macchia conducting, Los Angeles, CA

Frank Macchia (born October 12, 1958) is an American composer, arranger, saxophonist, and multi-reed player in Los Angeles. Originally from San Francisco he began playing clarinet at age 10 and later studied bassoon, saxophone and flute. At 14 he began studying musical composition and writing jazz and classical music pieces. He is known for his large catalog of eclectic and virtuosic original compositions spanning jazz, classical, Cajun, Americana, experimental, New Age, Spoken Word, and jazz-fusion styles as well as his extensive work as a composer and orchestrator for live television and television and film soundtracks. Macchia has been noted for his jazz and orchestral arrangements of traditional American folk songs.

== Early career ==
In 1976, Macchia attended Berklee College of Music where he studied woodwinds with Joe Viola, Joseph Allard, and Steve Grossman. His composition and arranging teachers included Herb Pomeroy, Phil Wilson, Tony Texiera, Ken Pullig, and Greg Hopkins.

In 1979, Macchia received DownBeat magazine’s award (second place) for best original big band composition. In 1980, he was awarded a grant from the National Endowment for the Arts to compose a jazz/classical suite for large ensemble. After earning a degree in Traditional Composition, Macchia taught at Berklee from 1980 to 1981.

From 1981 to 1992, Macchia lived in the San Francisco Bay Area where he continued composing and performing with his own ensembles; The Gleets, Desperate Character, and The Frankie Maximum Band. He also performed with many other artists including Ella Fitzgerald, Tony Bennett, The Temptations, Clare Fischer, and Chuck Mangione. Macchia produced and released two CDs of original music during this period: Introducing Frankie Maximum and Frankie Maximum Goes Way-er Out West which foreshadowed some of his later work. Voting Frankie Maximum Goes Way-er Out West one of the Top Ten Records of the Year in 1991 Larry Kelp of the Oakland Tribune said:

"A cult masterpiece. Those who have heard it agree, this is a monster of a record."

== Film and television career ==
After touring Europe with productions of West Side Story and 42nd Street, Macchia moved to Burbank, California and began composing and orchestrating for television and film. Macchia has worked on more than 300 film and television productions including orchestration for: Your Highness, I Am Number Four, Astro Boy, Transformers, Fantastic Four, Fantastic Four: Rise of the Silver Surfer, Pirates of the Caribbean: At World’s End, Dreamgirls, Superman Returns, The Santa Clause 2, and Austin Powers in Goldmember. Macchia’s television music composition credits include: Nickelodeon’s Oh Yeah! Cartoons and Fox TV’s Night Visions. For several years (1992-2010), Macchia created music and arrangements for The Tonight Show band.

== Little Evil Things ==
From 1997 to 2001, Macchia and writer/actress Tracy London collaborated on a series of 5 orchestrated Spoken word productions called Little Evil Things. Original stories in the style of 1950’s horror comic books, were performed by actors including Dave Florek, Jim McDonnell, and Susan Hull, with artwork created by Guy Vasilovich. Each volume consisted of 4 to 5 stories with musical soundtracks by created by Macchia. Several pieces of music from this series were recorded by the Moscow Symphony Orchestra.

Billboard magazine described this unusual approach:

"What makes this audio unique is its film-like musical score. The audiobook's co-author Macchia, an award-winning composer, tailored the original music to the actors' performances. The result is a perfect marriage of words and music that sets an effective, creepy atmosphere."

== Los Angeles jazz composer ==
Macchia has recorded a series of original projects featuring some of the best musicians in Los Angeles as well as European orchestras.

In 2003, he released The Galapagos Suite, a set of 6 pieces, each capturing his musical impression of one of the species that inhabit the Galapagos Islands. The record features Macchia (woodwinds and synthesizers), Billy Childs (piano) Valarie King (flutes), Beverly Dahlke-Smith (bassoon) Grant Geissman (guitar), Alex Iles, Ken Kugler, and Bruce Fowler, (trombones). While this recording was generally received as a ‘new age’ project, Macchia had begun his exploration of unusual instrumental combinations, particularly low register brass and woodwind instruments.

In 2004, Macchia released Animals which continued to explore his interest in program music and leitmotif. Each piece is named after an animal (tigers, gorillas, camels, etc.). Specific instruments and thematic ideas are used to represent the personality of each animal; for example, the tuba plays the role of the hippo. The pieces cover a wide range of musical styles, from accessible modern jazz to evolving, complex Brazilian-influenced arrangements. Macchia blends complex polyrhythms and intricately layered ensemble passages with open solo sections, relaxed grooves, and splashes of musical humor. The ensemble, augmented by Wayne Bergeron (trumpet and flugelhorn), Scott Breadman (percussion), Dave Carpenter (bass), Stephanie Fife (cello), Mark Isham (trumpet), Tracy London (voice), and former Frank Zappa sideman Vinnie Colaiuta (drums), is well suited for the technical challenges of Macchia’s music.

Mo’ Animals was released in 2006, and in many ways is a continuation of Macchia’s 2004 release. The recording uses most of the same musicians with the notable addition of the virtuosic Howard Levy (best known as a founding member of Béla Fleck and the Flecktones) on harmonica.

In 2006, Macchia released Emotions, another highly programmatic project in which each piece is loosely inspired by a primary human emotion. The recording features Macchia performing with the Prague Orchestra conducted by Adam Klemens. This recording also revisits Macchia’s recurring interest in American folk music with arrangements of "Black Is the Color of My True Love's Hair" and "The Lonesome Road". "Black is the Color of My True Love’s Hair" was nominated in the Best Instrumental Arrangement category of the 50th Grammy Awards.

Macchia followed up Emotions with another Prague Orchestra collaboration in his 2007 release, Landscapes. Michael G. Nastos, writing for AllMusic, compared this recording to Cityscapes, the 1982 collaboration between arranger Claus Ogerman and saxophonist Michael Brecker. Macchia again mixes original compositions with explorations of traditional American Folk Music with arrangements of Shenandoah, Deep River and Down in the Valley, which was nominated in the Best Instrumental Arrangement category of the 51st Grammy Awards.

In 2008, Macchia released one of his most unusual recordings, Saxolollapalooza features six saxophones and drums playing music in a wide variety of styles. The saxophones play all parts of the arrangements including the bass lines. The group consists of Eric Marienthal (Alto Sax, Soprano Sax, Flute), Sal Lozano (Alto Sax, Piccolo, Clarinet), Bob Sheppard (Tenor Sax, Clarinet, Flute), Frank Macchia (Tenor Sax, Bari Sax, Flute, Alto Flute, Clarinet, Contrabass Clarinet) Gene Cipriano (Bari Sax, Clarinet, Flute), Jay Mason (Bass Sax, Bass Clarinet), and Peter Erskine (Drums, Percussion). All but one piece are covers including Benny Goodman and Charlie Christian’s, "Air Mail Special", Michael Jackson's "Working Day and Night", Allen Toussaint’s "Java", (the trumpeter Al Hirt's hit), "Creole Love Call" by Duke Ellington, and "Work Song" by Nat Adderley. The record continues Macchia’s work with traditional American folk songs with arrangements of "Down by the Riverside", "Swing Low, Sweet Chariot", and "Shortening Bread".

In 2010, Macchia dove head first into his jazz treatments of traditional American folk songs with Folk Songs for Jazzers. This recording features fourteen tracks: "I've Been Working on the Railroad", "Red River Valley", "Skip to My Lou", "Oh! Susanna", "Did You Ever See a Lassie?", "Polly Wolly Doodle", "Tom Dooley", "The Arkansas Traveller", "Amazing Grace", "The Erie Canal", "Hush Little Baby", "The Blue Tail Fly", "Kumbaya", and "On Top of Old Smokey". The album features a big band of Los Angeles musicians: Wayne Bergeron (Flugelhorn, Trumpet), Peter Erskine (Drums), Ray Frisby (Percussion and Vibraphone), Grant Geissman (Banjo and Electric guitar), Ellis Hall (Vocal on Amazing Grace), Trey Henry (Acoustic and Electric Bass), Alex Iles (Baritone Horn, Trombone, Tuba), Valarie King (Bass Flute), Sal Lozano (Clarinet, Bass Clarinet, Flute, Bass Flute, Piccolo, Alto Saxophone), Frank Macchia (Clarinet, Alto Clarinet, Bass Clarinet, Contrabass Clarinet, Flute, Alto Flute, Bass Flute, Contrabass Flute, Piccolo, Tenor Sax), Jay Mason (Clarinet, Bass Clarinet, Flute, Bass Flute, English Horn, Piccolo, Baritone Saxophone, Bass Saxophone), Kevin Porter (Baritone Horn, Trombone, Bass Trombone, Tuba), Tom Ranier (Piano, Electric Piano), Bill Reichenbach (Baritone Horn, Trombone, Bass Trombone, Tuba), Bob Sheppard (Clarinet, Bass Clarinet, Flute, Alto Flute, Bass Flute, Piccolo, Soprano Saxophone, Tenor Saxophone), Tierney Sutton (vocal, Red River Valley).

In addition to the unique choice of material, this recording showcases Macchia’s interest in unusual instrumental combinations and the use of high and low register members of the brass and woodwind families not typically utilized in big band music.

Macchia’s arrangement of "Skip To My Lou" earned him his third Grammy nomination in the Best Instrumental Arrangement category of the 53rd Grammy Awards.

In 2011, Macchia released SON of Folk Songs For Jazzers, Chapter 2 of his 2010 big band project. This recording features the same musicians featured on the first release with the substitution of Michael Hatfield (Vibraphone, Marimba, Bass Marimba, Xylophone, Glockenspiel, Tambourine, Shaker) for Ray Frisby.

Son of Folk Songs for Jazzers features Macchia’s arrangements of "Twinkle, Twinkle, Little Star"; "Careless Love"; two versions of "Three Blind Mice"; "Itsy, Bitsy, Spider"; "Work Song Medley" ("Pick a Bale of Cotton"; "Shortnin’ Bread"); "Silver Dagger"; Medley: ("Cindy"; "Li’l Liza Jane"); "Frankie and Johnny"; "Billy Boy"; "This Old Man" (featuring a vocal performance by Macchia); and The Boating Medley ("Michael Row Your Boat Ashore"; "Row, Row, Row Your Boat").

In 2011, Macchia formed the electric six-piece funk band, Swamp Thang (Macchia composer, vocals, saxophones, and flutes, Ken Rosser and Eric Jensen electric guitars, John Rosenberg keyboards, Tommy Lockett electric bass, Frank Briggs drums). The group released two records, the self-titled Swamp Thang in 2012 and Fried Zombie Stew in 2013. "The versatile saxophonist takes a trip into a sonic landscape of bayou boogie, blues, funk, and New Orleans second-line with joyful and freewheeling attitude, letting the good times roll wild and crazy." wrote All About Jazz critic Dan McClenaghan of the initial release. DownBeat magazine reviewer Michael Jackson gave Fried Zombie Stew three and a half stars.

In late 2013, Macchia recorded a new large ensemble record for January 2014 release entitled Grease Mechanix, featuring Eric Marienthal, Brandon Fields, Bob Sheppard, Macchia, Sal Lozano, Jay Mason on reeds, Wayne Bergeron, Dan Fornero, Walt Fowler on trumpets, Alex Iles, Kevin Porter, Craig Gosnell on trombones, Bill Reichenbach on tuba, Ken Rosser on electric guitar, Peter Erskine on drums and Brad Dutz on percussion.

Macchia worked with drummer-percussionist Brock Avery to create Rhythm Kaleidoscope, which was released in November 2018. Brock created improvised drum solos that Macchia then took and composed music for, utilizing up to 40 woodwinds and added sampled orchestra in addition to guest soloists Stefanie Fife on cello, Alex Iles on trombone and Eric Jensen on electric guitar.

This has been followed up by another EP entitled Rhythm Abstraction:Azure along the lines of Rhythm Kaleidoscope where Brock created more improvised drum solos that Frank composed music to. This first of three EPs was released Jan 21, 2020 for digital downloads and streaming. The second EP, "Rhythm Abstraction: Gold" was released April 21, 2020. And the third and final installment of the trilogy, "Rhythm Abstraction: Ruby" was released for digital download and streaming on July 21, 2020.

In 2021 Frank released Songs For Tracy a group of art songs composed for his wife Tracy London, who was the featured vocalist, he also wrote the lyrics to this collection of jazz, latin, pop and art songs, with a few pieces that used 12 tone serial composition.

Then in 2022 he composed and produced Bluezapaloozaa set of original blues pieces featuring Frank on vocals, saxophones, keyboards and Ken Rosser on electric guitars, Brock Avery on drums, Larry Walker guest vocalist and Tracy London on background vocals.

Frank retired from orchestration and film music production work in 2016 and has continued creating new albums of original music exploring his fascination with harmony, melody and rhythm. He took a few years between 2020-2026 (during the pandemic) to learn the Oboe, English Horn and Bass Oboe, and also t get reaquainted with the bassoon, which he had stopped playing at 18 years old.

In 2026 he released his first album in four years, WindWorx Volume 1 featuring twelve new compositions for a 50 piece woodwind orchestra, composed of piccolos, flutes, alto flutes, bass flutes, contrabass flutes, oboes, English horns, bass oboes, clarinets, alto clarinets, bass clarinets, contrabass clarinets, bassoons, contrabassoons, and sopranino, soprano, alto, tenor, baritone and bass saxophones along with Brock Avery on drums and percussion.

== Discography ==
- 1990 Introducing Frankie Maximum
- 1991 Frankie Maximum Goes Way'er Out West
- 1997 Little Evil Things Volume 1
- 1998 Little Evil Things Volume 2
- 1999 Little Evil Things Volume 3
- 2000 Little Evil Things Volume 4
- 2001 Little Evil Things Volume 5
- 2003 The Galapagos Suite
- 2004 Animals
- 2006 Mo' Animals
- 2006 Emotions
- 2007 Landscapes
- 2008 Saxolollapalooza
- 2010 Folk Songs For Jazzers
- 2011 SON of Folk Songs For Jazzers
- 2012 Swamp Thang
- 2013 Fried Zombie Stew
- 2014 Grease Mechanix
- 2015 The Pale Emperor
- 2019 Rhythm Kaleidoscope
- 2020 Rhythm Abstraction: Azure(EP)
- 2020 Rhythm Abstraction: Gold(EP)
- 2020 Rhythm Abstraction: Ruby(EP)
- 2021 Songs For Tracy
- 2022 Bluesapalooza
- 2026 WindWorx Volume 1

== Awards ==
- 1979 DownBeat Award (second place) - Best Original Big Band Composition
- 1980 National Endowment For the Arts Grant
- 1997 Publishers Weekly Listen Up! Award (Little Evil Things)
- 2008 Nomination: Best Instrumental Arrangement - 50th Grammy Awards
- 2009 Nomination: Best Instrumental Arrangement - 51st Grammy Awards
- 2011 Nomination: Best Instrumental Arrangement - 53rd Grammy Awards

== Selected filmography: composition ==
- 1989 America’s Funniest Home Videos (TV series)
- 1992 The Tonight Show with Jay Leno (TV series)
- 1996 Merlin’s Shop of Mystical Wonders
- 1997 Cold Case (television film)
- 1998 Oh Yeah! Cartoons (TV series)
- 2001 Homeland (documentary)
- 2001-2002 Night Visions (TV series, 12 episodes)
- 2002 The Boogerman
- 2002 The Boy Who Cried Alien (TV short)
- 2004 Unearthly Harvest
- 2004 White Chicks (stock music)
- 2006 The Axe Man (short)
- 2007 Hideous (short)
- 2008 The HusBand (short)
- 2009 Bleeder (TV Series)

== Selected filmography: orchestration and arranging ==
- 1992 Single White Female (music preparation)
- 1993 Hard Target (music preparation)
- 1995 Wild Bill (orchestrator, uncredited)
- 1995 Ace Ventura: When Nature Calls (music preparation)
- 1995 Batman Forever (music preparation)
- 1995 A Goofy Movie (percussion orchestration, uncredited)
- 1995 Houseguest (music preparation)
- 1996 Bastard Out of Carolina (orchestrator)
- 1996 The Island of Dr. Moreau (orchestrator)
- 1996 The Cable Guy (orchestrator, uncredited)
- 1996 The Substitute (orchestrator)
- 1996 James and the Giant Peach (music preparation, uncredited)
- 1996 Andersonville (television film - orchestrator)
- 1997 The Midas Touch (video - orchestrator)
- 1997 Oliver Twist (television film - orchestrator)
- 1997 Incognito (orchestrator)
- 1997 Murder, She Wrote: South by Southwest (television film - orchestrator, uncredited)
- 1997 Most Wanted (orchestrator, uncredited)
- 1997 George Wallace (television film - orchestrator)
- 1997 The Invader (orchestrator)
- 1997 Snow White: A Tale of Terror (television film - orchestrator)
- 1997 Double Team (orchestrator)
- 1997 Private Parts (orchestrator)
- 1997 The Summer of Ben Tyler (television film - orchestrator)
- 1998 I'll Be Home for Christmas (music preparation)
- 1998 The Lion King II: Simba's Pride (music preparation)
- 1998 Scooby-Doo on Zombie Island (music preparation)
- 1998 Apt Pupil (orchestrations)
- 1998 Halloween H20: 20 Years Later (orchestrator)
- 1998 Pocahontas II: Journey to a New World (music preparation)
- 1998 Goodbye Lover (orchestrator)
- 1998 A Bright Shining Lie (television film - orchestrator)
- 1998 Shadrach (orchestrator - uncredited)
- 1998 Barney's Great Adventure (orchestrator)
- 1998 I Woke Up Early the Day I Died (composer: additional score, orchestrator)
- 1999 Toy Story 2 (music preparation)
- 1999 Mickey's Once Upon a Christmas (music preparation)
- 1999 Komodo (orchestrator)
- 1999 One Man's Hero (orchestrator)
- 1999 Inspector Gadget (music preparation)
- 1999 Lake Placid (orchestrator)
- 1999 South Park: Bigger, Longer & Uncut (music preparation)
- 1999 Storm of the Century (TV mini-series - orchestrator)
- 1999 Breakfast of Champions (additional orchestrator)
- 1999 At First Sight (additional orchestrator)
- 2000 The Emperor's New Groove (music preparation)
- 2000 Get Carter (score conductor)
- 2000 Urban Legends: Final Cut (orchestrator)
- 2000 Men of Honor (orchestrator)
- 2000 Tweety's High-Flying Adventure (music preparation, uncredited)
- 2000 The Contender (orchestrator)
- 2000 An Extremely Goofy Movie (music preparation)
- 2000 The Tigger Movie (music preparation)
- 2001 Joe Somebody (orchestrator)
- 2001 Jimmy Neutron: Boy Genius (music preparation)
- 2001 Texas Rangers (music preparation)
- 2001 Out of the Black (orchestrator)
- 2001 Scary Movie 2 (orchestrator)
- 2001 ABC World Stunt Awards (TV special - conductor, musical director)
- 2001 See Spot Run (music preparation, uncredited)
- 2001 3000 Miles to Graceland (composer assistant, score synth programmer, score technical assistant)
- 2001 Lady and the Tramp II: Scamp's Adventure (music preparation)
- 2001 Kingdom Come (conductor)
- 2002 The Hot Chick (music preparation)
- 2002 The Santa Clause 2 (music assistant)
- 2002 Austin Powers in Goldmember (orchestrator)
- 2002 Eight Legged Freaks (orchestrator)
- 2002 Sorority Boys (music preparation)
- 2002 The Hunchback of Notre Dame II (music preparation, uncredited)
- 2002 Snow Dogs (music preparation)
- 2003 Pirates of the Caribbean: The Curse of the Black Pearl (music copyist, music preparation)
- 2003 The Lizzie McGuire Movie (music preparation)
- 2003 X2 (orchestrator)
- 2003 Ghosts of the Abyss (documentary short - orchestrator)
- 2003 Piglet's Big Movie (music preparation)
- 2003 The Jungle Book 2 (music preparation)
- 2004 Spanglish (music preparation)
- 2004 National Treasure (music preparation, uncredited)
- 2004 Mickey's Twice Upon a Christmas (music preparation)
- 2004 The Incredibles (music preparation)
- 2004 Ladder 49 (orchestrator)
- 2004 Cellular (orchestrator - uncredited)
- 2004 The Princess Diaries 2: Royal Engagement (music arranger, music preparation)
- 2004 Miracle (orchestrator)
- 2005 Chicken Little (music transcriptor)
- 2005 Lilo & Stitch 2: Stitch Has a Glitch (music preparation)
- 2005 Sky High (music preparation)
- 2005 Fantastic Four (additional orchestrator)
- 2005 Kiss Kiss Bang Bang (orchestrator - uncredited)
- 2005 Kicking & Screaming (orchestrator)
- 2005 Ice Princess (music arranger)
- 2005 Pooh's Heffalump Movie (music preparation)
- 2005 Hide and Seek (additional orchestrator)
- 2006 Dreamgirls (orchestrator)
- 2006 The Santa Clause 3: The Escape Clause (music preparation)
- 2006 The Guardian (orchestrator)
- 2006 Brother Bear 2 (music preparation)
- 2006 Pirates of the Caribbean: Dead Man's Chest (music preparation)
- 2006 Superman Returns (orchestrator)
- 2006 Click (music preparation)
- 2006 Cars (music preparation)
- 2006 Mission: Impossible III (music preparation)
- 2006 The Shaggy Dog (music transcriptor, uncredited)
- 2006 Man About Town (additional orchestrator)
- 2006 Glory Road (music arranger: mariachi music)
- 2007 National Treasure: Book of Secrets (music preparation, orchestrator)
- 2007 Bee Movie (music preparation)
- 2007 Enchanted (music preparation)
- 2007 The Invasion (orchestrator)
- 2007 Transformers (percussion/choir orchestration)
- 2007 Fantastic Four: Rise of the Silver Surfer (score orchestrator)
- 2007 Pirates of the Caribbean: At World's End (percussion/choir orchestration)
- 2007 Wild Hogs (music preparation)
- 2007 The Number 23 (music preparation)
- 2008 Bedtime Stories (music preparation)
- 2008 High School Musical 3: Senior Year (orchestrator)
- 2008 Tinker Bell (music preparation)
- 2009 It's Complicated (music preparation)
- 2009 The Princess and the Frog (music preparation)
- 2009 Astro Boy (orchestrator)
- 2009 Up (music preparation)
- 2009 Star Trek (music preparation)
- 2009 The 81st Annual Academy Awards (TV special - music arranger)
- 2009 Old Dogs (midi orchestration)
- 2010 Shrek Forever After (music preparation)
- 2010 A Nightmare on Elm Street (orchestrator)
- 2010 How Do You Know (music preparation, uncredited)
- 2010 Tangled (music preparation)
- 2010 Megamind (music preparation)
- 2010 Inception (music preparation)
- 2010 The Sorcerer's Apprentice (orchestrator)
- 2004-2010 Lost (TV series - music preparation, 114 episodes)
- 2011 Pirates of the Caribbean: On Stranger Tides (music preparation)
- 2011 Your Highness (orchestrator)
- 2011 Straw Dogs (orchestrator)
- 2011 I Am Number Four (orchestrator)
- 2011 The Muppets (music preparation)
- 2011 Fright Night (percussion orchestration)
- 2011 The Smurfs (music preparation)
- 2011 Zookeeper (music preparation)
- 2011 Cars 2 (music preparation)
- 2004-2011 Desperate Housewives (TV series - music preparation, 158 episodes)
- 2012 Wreck-It Ralph (music preparation)
- 2012 The Dark Knight Rises (music preparation)
- 2013 Anchorman 2: The Legend Continues (music preparation)
- 2013 Frozen (music preparation)
- 2013 Planes (music preparation)
- 2013 The Smurfs 2 (music preparation)
- 2014 The Amazing Spider-Man 2 (music preparation)
- 2014 Muppets Most Wanted (music preparation)
