= Friends, Treasures, Heroes =

Studio album by Bob Florence
- Recorded: August 2005
- Genre: Jazz
- Label: Summit

Friends, Treasures, Heroes is a solo piano album by Bob Florence. It was recorded in 2005 and released by Summit Records.

== Recording and music ==
Bob Florence was "known primarily as a bandleader, composer/arranger, and jazz educator", but also recorded a few solo piano albums. This example was recorded in August 2005. The main compositions are linked together by interludes and bridging sections. "Jools" is a tribute to Julie Andrews, with whom Florence played on several tours.

== Release and reception ==
Professional ratings
Review scores
Source	Rating
AllMusic	4.5/5 stars
The Penguin Guide to Jazz	3/4 stars

Friends, Treasures, Heroes was released by Summit Records. The AllMusic reviewer concluded: "This beautifully crafted recording is easily one of Bob Florence's greatest achievements." The Penguin Guide to Jazz commented that the choice and linking of material "works beautifully". The JazzTimes reviewer mentioned the romantic mood prevalent on the album and wrote: "you would have to have a heart of stone not to like this record."

== Track listing ==
1. "Just Friends/Wind Beneath My Wings" – 3:53
2. "Invitation/On Green Dolphin Street" – 5:53
3. "Interlude" – 1:56
4. "My Sunshine Connection" – 4:34
5. "Interlude" – 0:39
6. "A Time for Love/The Shadow of Your Smile" – 4:36
7. "Interlude" – 1:11
8. "Mulholland Falls" – 6:33
9. "Interlude" – 1:26
10. "Whippoorwill/Nobody Else But Me/I'm Old Fashioned" – 6:09
11. "Interlude" – 0:47
12. "Jools/Come Rain or Some Shine" – 5:17
13. "Interlude" – 1:20
14. "Pensitiva" – 4:32
15. "Interlude" – 0:26
16. "Maria, Queen of the Birders" – 5:15
17. "Just Friends/Wind Beneath My Wings (Reprise)" – 1:32

== Personnel ==
- Bob Florence – piano
