= No One Home =

Studio album by Lalo Schifrin
- Released: 1979
- Recorded: March 27–28, 1979 with overdubs on April 13 & 17, May 17 and July 2, 1979; Los Angeles, California
- Genre: Disco
- Length: 32:23
- Label: Tabu; JZ 36091
- Producer: Lalo Schifrin

Lalo Schifrin chronology
Boulevard Nights (1978)	No One Home (1979)	Amityville Horror (1979)

No One Home is an album by Argentine composer, pianist and conductor Lalo Schifrin recorded in 1979 and released on the Tabu label.

== Track listing ==
1. "No One Home" (Lalo Schifrin, Gale Garnett) – 6:45
2. "Oh Darlin'... Life Goes On" (Minnie Riperton, Richard Rudolph, Freddie Perren) – 4:32
3. "Enchanted Flame" (Lalo Schifrin, Cheyenne Fowler, Donna Schifrin) – 5:16
4. "You Feel Good" (Lalo Schifrin, Gale Garnett) – 7:11
5. "Memory of Love" (Lalo Schifrin, Maya Angelou) – 4:39
6. "Middle of the Night" (Monique Adelbert, Louis Adelbert) – 4:00

== Personnel ==
- Lalo Schifrin – keyboards, arranger, conductor
- Chuck Findley, Jerry Hey – trumpet, flugelhorn
- Alan Kaplan, William Reichenbach – trombone
- Ernie Watts, Kim Richmond – woodwinds
- Michael Boddicker, Patrice Rushen, Ian Underwood – keyboards
- Paul Jackson, Jr., Tim May – guitar
- Byron Miller, Ed Watkins – bass
- Alex Acuña, Leon "Ndugu" Chancler – drums
- Paulinho da Costa – percussion
- Wah Wah Watson – voice bag & Guitar
- Sylvia Smith, Lynn Davis, Virginia Ayers, Sandy Graham, Ron Hicklin, Eddie Lehann, John Bahler, Debbie Hall – vocals
- Harry Bluestone, Henry Ferber, Mari Botnick, Arnold Belnick, William Kurasch, Ronald Fulsom, John Wittenberg, Endre Granat, Assa Drori, Nathan Ross, Stanley Plummer – violin
- Janet Lakatos, David Schwartz, Gareth Nuttycombe, Allan Harshman – viola
- Douglas Davis, Raphael Kramer, Raymond Kelley, Dennis Karmazyn – cello
