= Carlos Franzetti =

Argentine-American composer (born 1948)

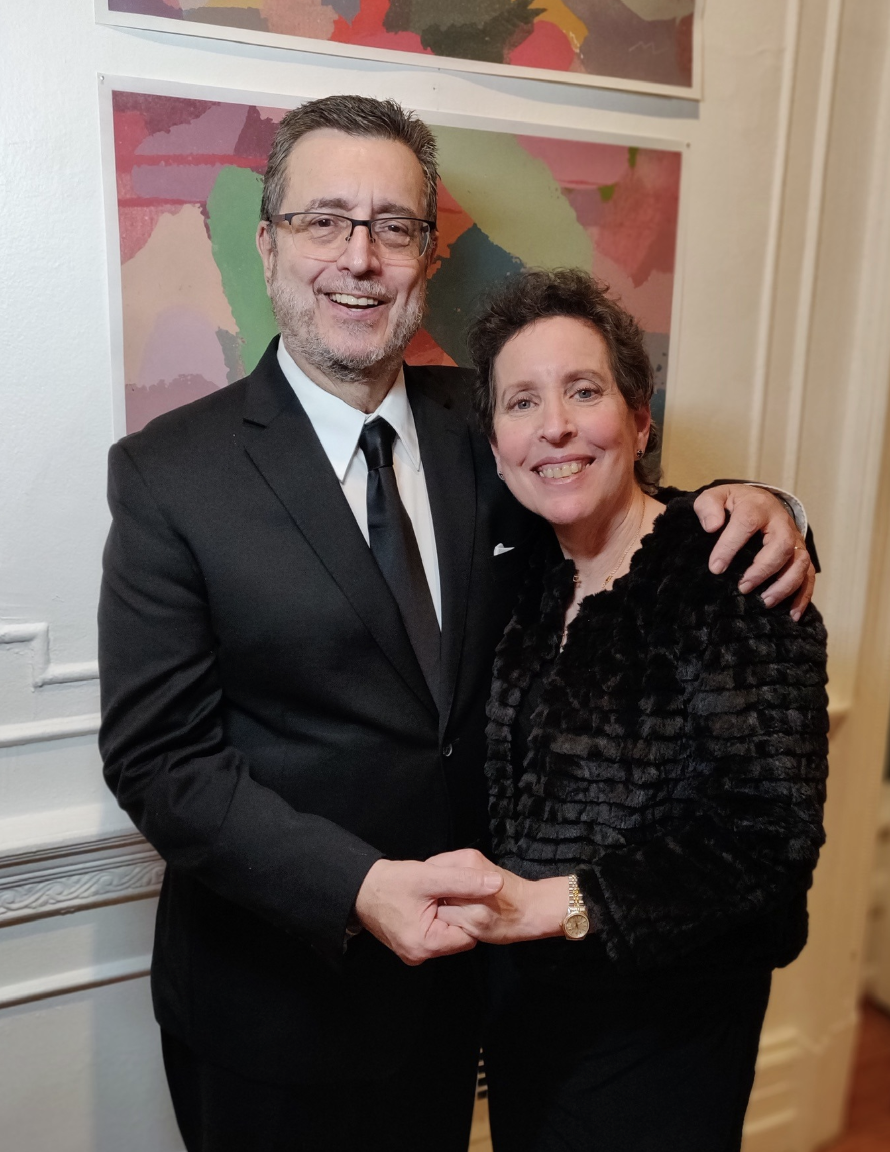
- Born: June 3, 1948 (age 77); Buenos Aires, Argentina
- Occupations: Composer, pianist
- Years active: 1970 -present
- Spouses: Allison Brewster Franzettii (m. 1994)
- Children: 2

Carlos Alberto Franzetti (born June 3, 1948) is an Argentine-American composer and arranger.

== Early life ==
Franzetti was born on June 3, 1948, in Buenos Aires, Argentina to Carlos Osvaldo Franzetti and Beatriz Julia Elena DeGiacomo de Franzetti. He had one older sister, Beatriz "Ago" Franzetti. The Franzetti family was of Italian, Spanish and Irish ancestry and practiced Catholicism.

== Music career ==
Franzetti started studying music at the National Conservatory in Buenos Aires at the age of six and later began taking private piano lessons. He began studying music composition after moving to Mexico in 1970 with Humberto Hernandez Medrano. Mr. Franzetti moved to the U.S. in 1974 working at first with Salsa bands and later composing and arranging music for advertising. He studied for two years at Juilliard School, where he continued his conducting studies with Vincent La Selva.

Throughout his career, Franzetti has composed symphonies, concertos, operas, chamber music, and big band jazz. He has arranged music for The Boston Pop Orchestra, the Brooklyn Philharmonic, the Buffalo Philharmonic Orchestra, the Stockholm Jazz Orchestra, Orchestra Cologne, The City of Prague Philharmonic, Filarmónica de Buenos Aires, Orquesta Nacional de Mexico, Brussels Jazz Orchestra, Camerata Bariloche and many others.

Franzetti has composed a number of film scores, most notably Beat Street, Misunderstood and 1992's The Mambo Kings with Robert Kraft. He also composed the 1986 film La Película del Rey and conducted and arranged the score for Sidney Lumet's 1990 film, Q & A.

== Awards and honors ==
His album Tango Fatal won the 2001 Latin Grammy Award for Best Tango Album. In addition he has won two Latin Grammies for Best Contemporary Classical Compositions. Another Latin Grammy for his album Duets with Eddie Gomez, as well as a Grammy and Latin Grammy as producer of Ruben Blades album Tangos. In 2003, he received two Grammy Award nominations for his album Poeta de Arrabal in the categories Best Classical Crossover Album and a Best Instrumental Arrangement. He also received a nomination for Best Contemporary Classical Composition for his opera, Corpus Evita and a Best Instrumental Arrangement for "Song Without Words" on the album Alborada. He is a recipient of two gold records. Two Composer in Residence Grants from Meet the Composer, and a Fellowship from the New Jersey Council for the Arts. He conducted, arranged, and co-produced soloist Paquito D'Rivera's Grammy-winning album Portraits of Cuba, as well as arranging and conducting Latin Grammy winner Coral with soloist David Sánchez, Grammy nominee Remembrances with soloist Jon Faddis, and many others.

== Discography ==
- 1976: The Prime Element
- 1977: Graffiti
- 1979: Galaxy Dust
- 1983: Prometheus
- 1984: New York Toccata
- 1991: Orquesta Nova
- 1992: Salon New York with Orquesta Nova
- 1993: Tropic of Capricorn
- 1994: Soundtracks and Jazz Tunes
- 1995: Astor Piazzolla: A Flute and Piano Tribute (with Jorge de la Vega)
- 1995: Images Before Dawn: Symphonic Music of Carlos Franzetti
- 1997: Poeta de Arrabal
- 1997: Portraits of Cuba (by Paquito D'Rivera)
- 1998: Concierto del Plata
- 1998: Piano Concerto n.º 2 / Sinfonía n.º 1
- 1999: Remembrances
- 1999: Obsession
- 2000: Tango fatal
- 2002: Poeta de Arrabal
- 2003: Reflexiones
- 2003: You Must Believe in Spring
- 2004: Prometheus
- 2005: Corpus Evita
- 2005: The Jazz Kamerata (Chesky)
- 2005: The Prime Element
- 2006: Songs for Lovers (Chesky)
- 2007: Graffiti
- 2007: Carlos Franzetti Trío Live in Buenos Aires
- 2008: Film Noir (with guest alto saxophone soloist: Andy Fusco)
- 2008: Galaxy Dust
- 1998: Piano Concerto n.º 1 / Sinfonía n.º 2 Atlantis
- 2008: Duets (with Eddie Gómez)
- 2009: Mambo Tango
- 2010: New York Meeting (with Gato Barbieri, David Finck, and Néstor Astarita)
- 2011: Alborada
- 2012: Masters of Bandoneón / Tema Stringazo
- 2012: Pierrot et Colombine
- 2014: In the Key of Tango
- 2016: Lejanía (with Allison Brewster Franzetti)
- 2017: Argentum
- 2018: Buenos Aires Noir (with Allison Brewster Franzetti)
- 2019: Ricordare (with David Finck and Eliot Zigmund)
- 2022: In the We Small Hours (with David Finck and Billy Drummond)
