= March of the Tadpoles =

Studio album by Toshiko Akiyoshi – Lew Tabackin Big Band
- Released: 1977
- Recorded: RCA Studio 'A', Hollywood, California, January 10–11, 1977
- Genre: Jazz
- Length: 36:56
- Label: Baystate Records
- Producer: Hiroshi Isaka

Toshiko Akiyoshi – Lew Tabackin Big Band chronology
Insights (1976)	March of the Tadpoles (1977)	Live at Newport '77 (1977)

Professional ratings
Review scores
Source	Rating
Allmusic link	4/5 stars

March of the Tadpoles was the fifth studio recording of the Toshiko Akiyoshi – Lew Tabackin Big Band. The album was released in Japan in 1977 by Baystate. The album received two 1985 Grammy Award nominations – for "Best Jazz Instrumental Performance - Big Band" and for "Best Arrangement on an Instrumental" (for the song, "March of the Tadpoles").

All tracks from this album are also included on the 2008 Mosaic 3 CD compilation, Mosaic Select: Toshiko Akiyoshi - Lew Tabackin Big Band.

== Track listing ==
All songs composed and arranged by Toshiko Akiyoshi:

LP side A

1. "March of the Tadpoles" – 6:54
2. "Mobile" – 5:20
3. "Deracinated Flower" – 8:14

LP side B

1. "Yellow is Mellow" – 8:53
2. "Notorious Tourist from the East" – 7:35

== Personnel ==
- Toshiko Akiyoshi – piano
- Lew Tabackin – tenor saxophone and flute
- Tom Peterson – tenor saxophone
- Dick Spencer – alto saxophone
- Gary Foster – alto saxophone
- Bill Perkins – baritone saxophone
- Steven Huffsteter – trumpet
- Bobby Shew – trumpet
- Mike Price – trumpet
- Richard Cooper – trumpet
- Charlie Loper – trombone
- Bill Reichenbach Jr. – trombone
- Rick Culver – trombone
- Phil Teele – bass trombone
- Don Baldwin – bass
- Peter Donald – drums

Guest artist:

- Emil Richards – percussion (on "Notorious Tourist from the East")
