= Dear Diz (Every Day I Think of You) =

Studio album by Arturo Sandoval
- Released: May 8, 2012
- Recorded: April–September 2011
- Studio: Glenwood Place Studios (Burbank, California): G Studio Digital (Studio City, California); Capitol Studios (Hollywood, California); Stepbridge Studios (Santa Fe, New Mexico); Turi's Music Recording Studio (Miami Springs, Florida); Markee Sound Studios (Deerfield Beach, Florida)
- Genre: Jazz
- Length: 69:45
- Label: Concord Jazz
- Producer: Arturo Sandoval: Gregg Field

Arturo Sandoval chronology
| Arturo Sandoval & WDR Big Band Mambo Nights (2011) | Dear Diz (Every Day I Think of You) (2012) | At Middleton (2014) |

Professional ratings
Review scores
| Source | Rating |
|---|---|
| AllMusic | 3.5/5 stars |

Dear Diz (Every Day I Think of You) is an album by Cuban jazz trumpeter Arturo Sandoval that won the Grammy Award for Best Large Jazz Ensemble Album in 2013. The album is Sandoval's tribute to his friend, Dizzy Gillespie. Musicians on the album include Gary Burton, Eddie Daniels, Joey DeFrancesco, and Bob Mintzer.

== Track listing ==
| No. | Title | Writer(s) | Length |
|---|---|---|---|
| 1. | "Be Bop" | Dizzy Gillespie | 8:18 |
| 2. | "Salt Peanuts! (Mani Salado)" | Gillespie, Kenneth Clarke | 6:48 |
| 3. | "And Then She Stopped" | Gillespie | 5:18 |
| 4. | "Birks Works (a la Mancini)" | Gillespie | 6:04 |
| 5. | "Things to Come" | Gillespie, Walter Gilbert Fuller | 7:11 |
| 6. | "Fiesta Mojo" | Gillespie | 5:09 |
| 7. | "Con Alma (With Soul)" | Gillespie | 6:00 |
| 8. | "Tin Tin Deo" | Walter Fuller, Chano Pozo | 6:52 |
| 9. | "Algo Bueno (Woody and Me)" | Gillespie | 6:15 |
| 10. | "A Night in Tunisia (Actually an Entire Weekend!)" | Gillespie, Frank Paparelli | 7:23 |
| 11. | "Every Day I Think of You" | Arturo Sandoval | 4:27 |

== Personnel ==
- Package Design - Albert J. Roman
- Engineer - Andrew Click
- Featured Artist, Trombone - Andrew Martin
- Bongos, Guest Artist - Andy Garcia
- Composer, Linear Notes, Primary Artist, Producer, Trumpet, Vocals - Arturo Sandoval
- Engineer - Bill Smith
- Featured Artist, Trombone - Bob McChesney
- Featured Artist, Guest Artist, Tenor Saxophone - Bob Mintzer
- Clarinet, Featured Artist, Tenor Saxophone - Bob Sheppard
- Guitar - Brian Nova
- Clarinet, Tenor Saxophone - Brian Scanlon
- Trombone - Bruce Otto
- Bass - Carlitos Del Puerto
- Assistant Engineer - Chad Carlisle
- Composer - Chano Pozo
- Arranger - Chris Walden
- Bass - Chuck Berghofer
- Bass Trombone - Craig Gosnell
- Arranger, Featured Artist, Flute, Alto Flute, Piccolo, Alto Saxophone - Dan Higgins
- Flugelhorn, Trumpet - Daniel Fornero
- Liner Notes - David Ritz
- Composer - Dizzy Gillespie
- Engineer, Mixing - Don Murray
- Engineer, Guitar - Dustin Higgins
- Featured Artist, Guest Artist, Tenor Saxophone - Ed Calle
- Clarinet, Featured Artist, Guest Artist - Eddie Daniels
- Engineer - Eddie Perez
- Composer - Frank Paparelli
- Shaker - Freddie Greene
- Featured Artist, Guest Artist, Vibraphone - Gary Burton
- Flugelhorn, Trumpet - Gary Grant
- Assistant Engineer, Engineer - Gerrit Kinkel
- Arranger - Gordon Goodwin
- Bass Clarinet, Baritone Saxophone - Greg Huckins
- Drums, Engineer, Guest Artist, Producer - Gregg Field
- Vocals - Joe Pesci
- Percussion - Joey De Leon
- Featured Artist, Guest Artist, Hammond B3 - Joey DeFrancesco
- Executive Producer - John Burk
- Drums - Johnny Friday
- Composer - Kenneth Clarke
- Photography - Manny Iriarte
- Featured Artist, Guest Artist, Vocals - Manolo Gimenez
- A&R - Mary Hogan
- Percussion - Munyingo Jackson
- Arranger - Nan Schwartz
- Mastering - Paul Blakemore
- Management - Phil Quartararo
- Featured Artist, Guest Artist, Tenor Saxophone - Plas Johnson
- Concert Master, Featured Artist, Violin - Ralph Morrison III
- Clarinet, Tenor Saxophone - Rob Lockart
- Liner Notes - Rob Simon
- Featured Artist, Viola - Roland Kato
- Alto Flute, Alto Saxophone - Rusty Higgins
- Featured Artist, Violin - Sara Perkins
- Arranger, Featured Artist, Piano - Shelly Berg
- Engineer - Steve Genewick
- Trombone - Steven Holtman
- Cello, Featured Artist - Trevor Handy
- Arranger, Featured Artist, Piano - Wally Minko
- Composer - Walter Fuller
- Composer - Walter Gilbert Fuller
- Flugelhorn, Trumpet - Wayne Bergeron
- Flugelhorn, Trumpet - Willie Murillo
- Featured Artist, Guest Artist, Alto Saxophone - Zane Musa

== Charts ==
| Chart (2012–13) | Peak position |
|---|---|
| US Top Jazz Albums (Billboard) | 9 |
