= Green Book (soundtrack) =

Green Book (Original Motion Picture Soundtrack)

Soundtrack album by Kris Bowers
- Released: November 16, 2018
- Genre: Jazz; classical
- Length: 57:32
- Label: Milan Entertainment
- Producer: Kris Bowers

Kris Bowers chronology
Monsters and Men (2018)	Green Book (2018)	Bad Hair (2020)

Green Book (Original Motion Picture Soundtrack) is the soundtrack album to the 2018 film of the same name, released digitally on November 16, 2018, and via CD on November 30, by Milan Records. For the film's soundtrack, director Peter Farrelly incorporated an original score by composer Kris Bowers and one of Don Shirley's own recordings. The soundtrack also includes rarities from 1950s and 1960s American music recommended to him by fellow singer Robert Plant. According to the label, it was streamed approximately 10,000 times per day during January 2019. This rate doubled the next month as the album surpassed one million streams worldwide and became the highest-streamed jazz soundtrack in Milan's history.

== Development ==
The selection of songs from the film was assisted by singer Robert Plant, who was dating a friend of Farrelly's wife at the time he had finished the film's script. During dinner on a double date, his wife and her friend stepped outside to smoke and the director asked Plant for advice on picking songs for the film that would be relatively unknown to contemporary audiences. This prompted Plant to play Farrelly songs via YouTube, including Sonny Boy Williamson II's "Pretty 'Lil Thing" and Robert Mosley's "Goodbye, My Lover, Goodbye". In an interview with Forbes, the director explained that the soundtrack ended up not only avoiding rote nostalgia, "but also those songs were really inexpensive and I did not have a huge budget so I was able to come up with some sensational pop songs from the time that were long forgotten." The music played at the black blues club toward the end of the film featured the piano performance of Étude Op. 25, No. 11 (Chopin), known as the Winter Wind etude by Chopin, was not included in the album.

Kris Bowers, while composing the film's score felt that his connection with Don Shirley came with the reference of his grandparents when he moved to Panhandle, Texas to Los Angeles, California and used to travel back and forth between, which was very accurate with the film's plot. He was experienced with Shirley's technique on combining multiple genres apart from jazz, adding that "I heard so much jazz vocabulary in what he was doing, but what was unique about his approach was that everything was performed in a very classical manner and everything he was playing was very virtuosic or very pianistic. And I have heard a lot of people use jazz and classical in different ways, but not really in that way. I've never heard somebody take the jazz vocabulary and perform it in a classical way. Seeing somebody combine these art forms or combine these genres in their own personal unique way was very inspiring just because I'm similarly inspired and into a lot of different styles of music."

Bowers practiced nearly eight to nine hours per day, to accurately match Shirley's composition, and referenced some of his old recordings, though it had a lower quality. This meant that he had to re-record the sounds, so he practiced Mahershala Ali (who plays Shirley onscreen) with three lessons to match the musical themes. The training nearly continued for three months, and a step-by-step replication of performing the tunes composed by Shirley. Bowers added "When he knew that he was shooting a song, the day before, a few days before, he asked me to record video of myself playing through the song so he could watch me over and over and over again. After that, before we did the take, we set up a keyboard in his trailer and I would play for him over and over again just so he could sit across from me and watch. Then we were on stage when he was playing, and I was standing off in the wings doing air piano to show him where he should be." In the film, Bowers also served as the "ghost pianist" for Ali, while playing the tunes. While editing the film, Patrick J. Don Vito, the film's editor had color corrected Bower's hands to match Ali's skin tone, and also edited his other body parts, to replicate the tune. This helped Bowers being offered scoring duties for a number of television and video games.

== Track listing ==
No.	Title	Performer(s)	Length
1.	"That Old Black Magic"	The Green Book Copacabana Orchestra	2:13
2.	"881 7th Ave"	Kris Bowers	0:47
3.	"So Long Lovers Island"	The Blue Jays	2:21
4.	"Dr. Shirley's Luggage"	Kris Bowers	0:33
5.	"I Feel Fine"	Kris Bowers	0:44
6.	"A Letter From My Baby"	Timmy Shaw	2:50
7.	"You Took Advantage of Me"	The Blackwells	2:03
8.	"Blue Skies"	Kris Bowers	2:05
9.	"Dear Dolores"	Kris Bowers	1:04
10.	"Vacation Without Aggravaton"	Kris Bowers	2:35
11.	"Cookin'"	Al Casey Combo	2:14
12.	"What'cha Gonna Do"	Bill Massey	2:17
13.	"Water Boy"	Kris Bowers	4:53
14.	"Dearest One"	Jack's Four	2:09
15.	"Field Workers"	Kris Bowers	0:50
16.	"I Got a Call / The Exception"	Kris Bowers	1:16
17.	"Makeup For Wounds / It's a Complicated World"	Kris Bowers	1:22
18.	"Happy Talk"	Kris Bowers	1:21
19.	"I Love My Baby"	Bobby Page and the Riff-Raffs	2:03
20.	"Governor On the Line"	Kris Bowers	1:09
21.	"Need Some Sleep"	Kris Bowers	1:03
22.	"Make the First Move"	Kris Bowers	1:20
23.	"Lullaby of Birdland"	Kris Bowers	2:40
24.	"Let's Roll"	The Orange Bird Blues Band	1:48
25.	"Backwood Blues"	The Orange Bird Blues Band	1:38
26.	"The Lonesome Road"	Kris Bowers	2:28
27.	"Mmm Love"	Bob Kelly	2:31
28.	"Thanks Officer"	Kris Bowers	0:58
29.	"If You Want Me To"	Kris Bowers	1:42
30.	"Thank You For the Letters"	Kris Bowers	2:12
31.	"The Lonesome Road"	Don Shirley	2:23
Total length:			57:32

== Reception ==
Critical reviews for the score were positive, with Ani Bundel of Elite Daily felt that "The soundtrack is a celebration of this music, even including a piano piece played by the real Don Shirley, plus many other fantastic songs of the era, intermixed with original compositions by the movie's composer, Kristopher Bowers". The Film Scorer wrote "Although his score for Green Book may not necessarily be remembered in the years to come, Bowers’ work in reproducing Shirley’s original music will be, both for its skill and its reintroduction of a classical and jazz great to a new audience."

== Charts and certifications ==
Chart (2018)	Peak position
UK Soundtrack Albums (OCC)	36
US Top Jazz Albums (Billboard)	9

== Accolades ==
Award	Date of ceremony	Category	Recipient(s)	Result	Ref(s)
Critics' Choice Movie Awards	January 13, 2019	Best Score	Kris Bowers	Nominated	
Detroit Film Critics Society	December 3, 2018	Best Use of Music	Green Book	Nominated	
Hollywood Music in Media Awards	November 14, 2018	Best Original Score in a Feature Film	Kris Bowers	Nominated	
