= Signs of Life (Peter Apfelbaum album) =

Studio album by Peter Apfelbaum
- Released: 1991
- Genre: Jazz
- Label: Antilles
- Producer: Hans Wendl, Wayne Horvitz

Peter Apfelbaum chronology
Pillars (1979)	Signs of Life (1991)	Jodoji Brightness (1992)

Signs of Life is an album by the American musician Peter Apfelbaum, released in 1991. He is credited with his band the Hieroglyphics Ensemble. "Candles and Stone" was nominated for a Grammy Award for "Best Arrangement on an Instrumental". The album was nominated for a Bammie Award for "Outstanding Jazz Album".

== Production ==
The album was produced by Hans Wendl and Wayne Horvitz. More than 15 musicians contributed to the recording sessions, including Will Bernard on guitar and Paul Hanson on bassoon. "Folksong #7" is a reworking of the traditional spiritual "Michael, Row the Boat Ashore". "Grounding" is dominated by the interplay between bassoon and electric guitar.

== Critical reception ==
Professional ratings
Review scores
Source	Rating
AllMusic	3/5 stars
Chicago Tribune	3/4 stars
MusicHound Jazz: The Essential Album Guide	3.5/5 stars
Oakland Tribune	4/4 stars
The Penguin Guide to Jazz on CD, LP & Cassette	3.5/4 stars

The Chicago Tribune stated that "the pieces with the greatest range and change work best, while more static numbers ... seem the most strained." Fernando Gonzalez of The Boston Globe included the album on his list of the 10 most notable albums of 1991 and wrote, "Wildly ambitious and fearless, reedman and composer Apfelbaum and his large ensemble mix extended forms, subtle colors, unusual instrumentation and a big punch." The San Francisco Chronicle called the album "a dancing melange of Afro-Cuban, funk and reggae rhythms, jazz improvisation, gongs, bells and chanting voices."

The Houston Chronicle opined that "the band's earnest enthusiasm occasionally exceeds its abilities, and the lyrics hint at post-hippie pretension, but the spirit never wavers." The Boston Herald included Signs of Life on its list of the best underheard albums of 1991. The Tucson Citizen listed it as the 10th best jazz album of the year.

In 2000, Signs of Life was included in The Essential Jazz Records, Volume 2: Modernism to Postmodernism. In 2009, the San Francisco Examiner deemed it an "Essential Bay Area Jazz Album", praising "not only by the shear power of the big-group sound but the way Apfelbaum's delicate engineering of the tunes allows individual voice to shine through."

== Track listing ==
No.	Title	Length
1.	"Candles and Stones"
2.	"Walk to the Mountain (And Tell the Story of Love's Thunderclapping Eyes)"
3.	"Grounding"
4.	"The Last Door"
5.	"The World Is Gifted"
6.	"Chant #11"
7.	"Forwarding, Parts 1 & 2"
8.	"Samantha Smith"
9.	"Folksong #7"
10.	"Waiting"
