= Allison Brewster Franzetti =

American pianist and music educator

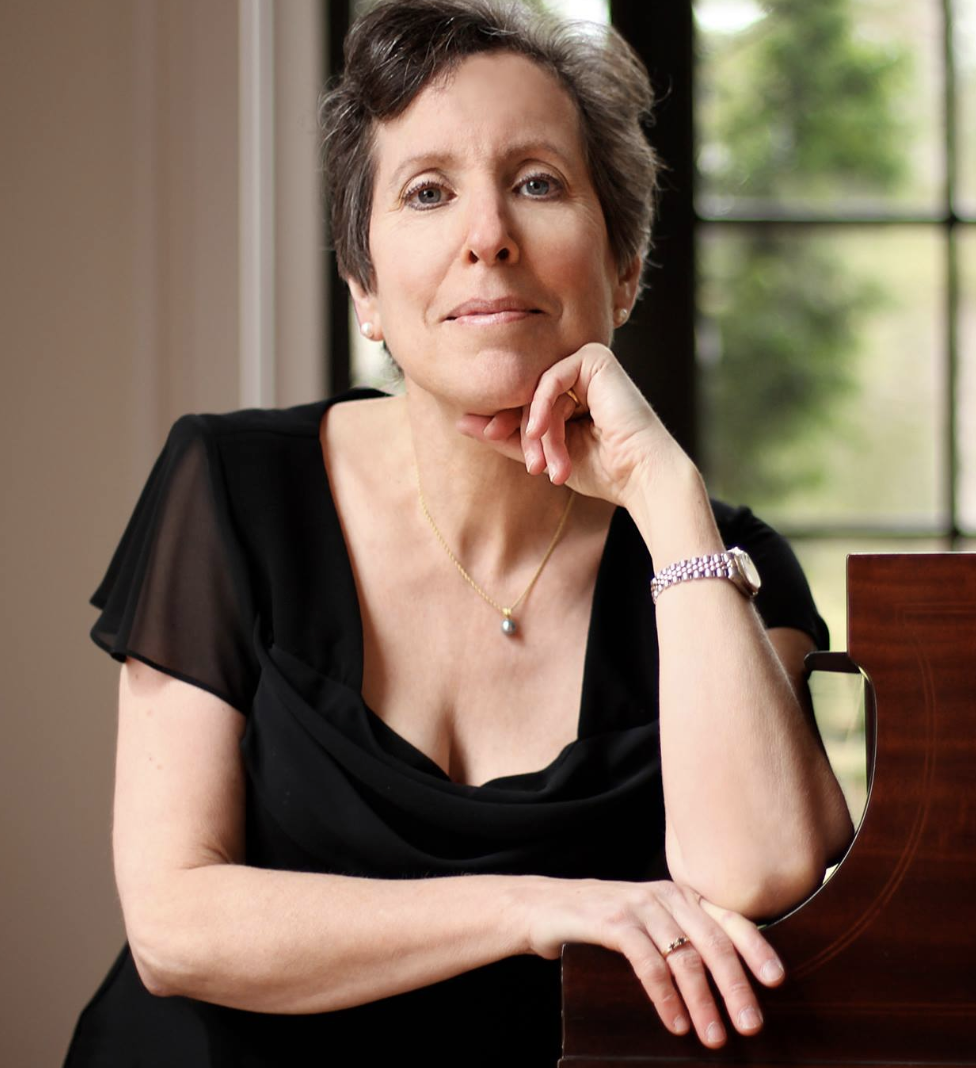
- Dr. Allison Brewster Franzetti, 2014
- Occupation: Concert Pianist
- Years active: 1974 -present
- Spouses: Carlos Franzetti (m. 1994)
- Children: 1

Allison Brewster Franzetti is an American pianist and music educator, originally from New York City.

== Personal life ==
Franzetti received a Bachelor of Music degree from the Manhattan School of Music, a Master of Music degree from the Juilliard School, and a Doctorate in Musical Arts from Mason Gross School of the Arts at Rutgers University. She has been nominated for 2 Grammy Awards and 3 Latin Grammy Awards.

She has been married to Carlos Franzetti since 1994 and they have one daughter, Mariana.

== Discography ==
- Pianista (Navona Records 2022)
- Buenos Aires Noir with Carlos Franzetti (Amapola Records 2018)
- Luminosa with Carlos Franzetti (Sunnyside Records 2016)
- Franzetti Plays Franzetti (Amapola Records 2015)
- Alma - Piano Music of Argentina (Amapola Records 2014)
- Mieczysław Weinberg: Complete Piano Works (Grand Piano 2012/2013)
- Carlos Franzetti: Pierrot et Colombine (Sunnyside, 2012)
- Carlos Franzetti: Alborada with the City of Prague Philharmonic (Amapola 2011)
- Aaron Copland: Quiet City with Christopher Brellochs and Paul Cohen (Sono Luminus 2011)
- Maurice Ravel: Ma Mere L'Oye, Valses nobles et sentimentales, Daphnis et Chloe Suite No. 2 (Amapola 2010)
- Carlos Franzetti: Piano Concerto No. 1 and Symphony No. 2 (Amapola 2009)
- 20th Century Piano Sonatas: Berg, Hindemith, Schoenberg, Hartmann (Naxos, 2007)
- Sonata Fantasy with Kimberly McCoul Risinger (Albany, 2007)
- American Piano Volume 5: South American Landscapes (Premier, 2004)
- Carlos Franzetti: Reflexiones (Amapola, 2004)
- Tango Ballet: Poeta de Arrabal (Amapola, 2002)
- Tango Bar (Chesky, 2001)
- Tango Fatal (Amapola, 2001)
- Roberto Sierra: El Mensajero de Plata (Newport Classics, 1999)
- Scriabin, Ravel, DeFalla (Amapola, 1999)
- The Unknown Piazzolla (Chesky, 1999)
- Roberto Sierra: El Mensajero de Plata (Newport Classics, 1999)
- Carlos Franzetti: Piano Concerto No. 2 and Symphony No. 1 (Amapola, 1998)
- Portraits of Cuba (Chesky, 1996)
- Images Before Dawn - The Symphonic Music of Carlos Franzetti (Premier, 1995)
