= Chris Walden =

German composer and conductor (born 1966)

- Born: 10 October 1966 (age 59); Hamburg, West Germany
- Genres: Jazz; classical; film
- Occupations: Musician; conductor; arranger; composer
- Instruments: Trumpet, piano
- Years active: 1987–present
- Labels: Origin, Edel
- Member of: Chris Walden Big Band
- Website: chriswalden.com

Chris Walden (born 10 October 1966) is a German composer, arranger, and conductor living in the US. He leads the Chris Walden Big Band, and is the founder and artistic director of the Pacific Jazz Orchestra.

He has written big band and orchestral arrangements for Michael Bublé, Diana Krall, Jennifer Hudson, Paul Anka, and Christopher Cross. Since 2019 Walden has been the lead arranger at the Academy Awards. He was an arranger for the TV series American Idol from 2007 to 2016. He has worked extensively for record producers David Foster, Phil Ramone, and Tommy LiPuma. Walden has composed for films and TV in the US and in Germany, including the long-running TV-series Dr. Stefan Frank.

== Education ==
Chris Walden grew up in Hamburg, West Germany where he learned to play the recorder at age 5, the piano at age 8, and the trumpet at age 13, which then became his main instrument. He started writing arrangements for local school big bands at age 16. He graduated from high school at age 19 and went on to study popular music at the Music Academy in Hamburg. At age 21 he moved to Cologne, Germany to study with trumpeters Jon Eardley and Malte Burba and arranger Jerry van Rooyen at the Cologne University of Music. He graduated in 1994 with two Masters of Music in trumpet and composition/arrangement.

In 1987, he joined the then newly formed German National Youth Jazz Orchestra (BuJazzO) as a trumpet player. Its leader Peter Herbolzheimer early on noticed Walden's interest in arranging and composing and became an important mentor for Walden.

== Early career in Germany ==
Chris Walden started to work professionally as a musician in his teens playing the trumpet in dance bands on weekends while still attending high school in Hamburg. He received his first professional arranging assignments through his mentor Peter Herbolzheimer and after moving to Cologne he went on to write arrangements for many of the German radio big bands and radio symphony orchestras. He continued to play trumpet at various studio recordings and musical theater.

In 1991, he assisted Peter Herbolzheimer in orchestrating the music to the German feature film "Schtonk!", which received an Oscar nomination in the category "Best Foreign Language Film". This led to work as a composer for more feature films and many TV movies and series in Germany, and Walden quickly became an in demand film composer in Germany.

He served as the musical director for four years for the televised German Movie Award show "Deutscher Filmpreis".

== Migrating to the U.S. ==
In 1996 at the age of 29, Walden moved to Los Angeles. He wrote scores for television movies and arrangements for Christopher Cross, Michael Bolton, Renee Olstead, Nancy Wilson, and Paul Anka. He continued to work for German television and musicians, such as Till Brönner, Al Bano, and David Hasselhoff.

In 1999, he founded the Chris Walden Big Band, which consists of Los Angeles based studio musicians. With this band he recorded three albums. The first received two Grammy Award nominations in 2005.

As a conductor, Walden has led the Los Angeles Philharmonic, New Mexico Symphony, Dallas Symphony, Columbus Symphony, National Symphony, West Australian Philharmonic, Munich Symphony, and the Slovak Radio Orchestra.

In 2007, during a three-month strike by Hollywood screenwriters, Walden composed his first major concert work, Symphony No.1 – The Four Elements. The recording with the Hollywood Studio Symphony received two Grammy Award nominations in 2008.

Since 2007, he has worked as an arranger for the television program American Idol. He has written arrangements for television appearances by Faith Hill, Christina Aguilera, Katie Holmes, Aretha Franklin, Yolanda Adams, Melissa Etheridge. In 2009 he arranged the National Anthem for Jennifer Hudson's performance at the Super Bowl XLIII.

In 2015, Walden served as conductor and arranger for the 38th Annual Kennedy Center Honors on CBS. In 2019, he was appointed lead arranger for the Academy Awards on ABC.

In 2022, Walden founded the Pacific Jazz Orchestra, a non-profit 40-piece ensemble in Los Angeles, for which he serves as artistic director.

Walden's works encompass 40 feature and TV films, more than 100 episodes of TV series, and more than 2000 arrangements for big band or symphony orchestras.

== Awards and honors ==
- Ernst-Fischer-Prize (1993)
- Ernst-Fischer-Prize (1998)
- Grammy Award nomination, Home of My Heart (2005)
- American Society of Music Arrangers and Composers award (2007)
- Grammy Award nomination, Symphony No. 1 – The Four Elements (2008)

== Discography ==
=== As leader ===
- Ticino (ACT, 1995)
- Sunset Boulevard (Button, 1998)
- Home of My Heart (Origin, 2005)
- No Bounds (Origin, 2006)
- Kurt Marti Suite (Origin, 2007)
- Full-On (Origin, 2014)

== See also ==
- List of music arrangers

== Sources ==
- Jack Behrens, Big Bands & Great Ballrooms ISBN 1-4259-6977-1
