= Mike Bogle =

American musician

Mike Bogle (James Michael Bogle; born 1961) is an American trombonist, pianist, vocalist, composer, and arranger. He attended the University of North Texas (BM Jazz Studies 1987, MM 1989) where he was a member of the world-renowned One O'Clock Lab Band.

His arrangement of Chick Corea's composition Got a Match? was nominated for a Grammy Award in 1992. This arrangement was recorded on "Lab '89." He was manager for the One O'Clock Lab Band for a few years. He currently resides in Dallas, TX where he is a freelance composer/arranger/performer and leads his experimental rock band Planet 9 as well as the Mike Bogle Jazztet and serves as musical director for Irene Cara and her band Hot Caramel.

Bogle has recorded two CDs: 1994's "Other Life" and 2004's "Eternal Family". Eternal Family reached # 28 on the Jazzweek Radio Chart.

Dr. Bogle's performance credits include: Irene Cara, Doc Severinsen, Bobby Caldwell, James Moody, Slide Hampton, Jaco Pastorius, Ira Sullivan, Pete Christlieb, Duffy Jackson, Burt Bacharach, Diana Ross, Tom Jones, "Mark Morganelli and The Jazz Forum All-Stars," The University of North Texas' One O'Clock Lab Band, Bobby Vinton, The Sambuca Big Band and Latin American artists Chequere, Los Cumbamberos, Willie Chirino and Lissette.
