= Les Hooper =

American classical composer

Les Hooper (born 27 February 1940 in Baton Rouge, Louisiana) is a composer in Los Angeles, US. His music ranges from classical to blues and jazz; from commercials to concert commissions. His credits include films, television, commercials, live performances, orchestral commissions, and many published pieces of music. He has won an Emmy Award and has had seven Grammy nominations, as well as Clio and film festival awards.

== Filmography ==
- Finney (1969)
- A Man Called Sloane (1979)
- Foxfire Light - Composer, Conductor (1982)
- State of the Union (1984)
- Hostages (1984)
- Out-of-Time Step (1984)
- Solar Crisis (1990)
- The Player (1992)
- Back in the USSR (1992)
- The Road Killers (1994)
- At the Hands of Another (1997)
- New American Heroes: The 1999 Senior Olympics (1999)
- Rocket's Red Glare (2000)
- Killing Christian (2003)
- Damaged - Composer (2003)

== Television credits (partial) ==
Year	Title	Info	Limited?	Label	OOP / SOLD OUT
1979	Lou Grant	Incomplete episodes: "Denial" (season 2) "Sweep" (season 2)	-----	-----	NO CD
1979	Rhoda	last season			
1979-80	Man Called Sloane	various episodes			
1982	The Master	season			
1979-81	Charlies Angels	various episodes			

== Discography ==
=== Les Hooper Big Band (Chicago Band) ===
- Look what they've done
- Dorian Blue

=== Les Hooper Big Band (L.A. Band) ===
- Raisin' the Roof
- Anything Goes
- Out of the Woods (Released December 5, 2006)
- Live at Typhoon

=== Hoopla ===
- Hoopla 1
- Hoopla 2
- Hoopla 3

=== Other ===
- Mirage
- Afrikka
- Crossing the Line
- For the Children
- Winterscapes
- Hoopla 3

== Awards and nominations ==
- Emmy "The Newperformers" NBC
- Clio "United Airlines Commercial"
- Grammy "Look What They've Done" Album (nomination)
- Grammy "Raisin the Roof" Album (nomination)
- Grammy "The Four of Us" Album (nomination)
- Grammy "Easy to Love" Album (nomination)
- Grammy "Anything Goes" Album (nomination)
