= Bob Florence =

American pianist, composer, arranger, and big band leader

- Born: Robert Chase Florence; May 20, 1932; Los Angeles, California, U.S.
- Died: May 15, 2008 (aged 75) Los Angeles
- Genres: Jazz, big band, pop
- Occupations: Musician, composer, arranger, band leader
- Instrument: Piano
- Years active: 1950s–2000s
- Labels: Liberty, Trend, MAMA

Bob Florence (May 20, 1932 – May 15, 2008) was an American pianist, composer, arranger, and big band leader.

== Career ==
A child prodigy, Florence began piano lessons before he was five years old and at seven gave his first recital. Although his early education was in classical music, he was drawn to jazz and big band. He went to Los Angeles City College and studied arranging and orchestration with Bob McDonald. He joined the college big band, and his classmates included Herb Geller and Tommy Tedesco.

Florence spent most of his career with big bands, as a leader, performer, composer, and arranger. After graduating from college, he was a member of bands led by Les Brown, Louis Bellson, and Harry James. His arrangement of "(Up A) Lazy River" for Si Zentner was a hit in 1960, and won a Grammy Award. Dave Pell hired him to work full-time as an arranger for Liberty Records. The job gave him the opportunity to write in several genres: bossa nova with Sérgio Mendes, jazz with Bud Shank, and pop vocal with Vic Dana. Florence was the piano player on Bobby Vee's number one hit "Take Good Care of My Baby" (1961).

He worked often in Hollywood as a bandleader, composer, and arranger for TV variety shows, hosted by Dean Martin, Red Skelton, and Andy Williams, and he wrote arrangements for the Tonight Show band led by Doc Severinsen. He won an Emmy Award for a program by Linda Lavin (1981) and another for a concert by Julie Andrews (1990).

In 1979 he returned to a recording career that had been sidetracked by other work. Twelve years separated Pet Project (World Pacific, 1967) from Live at Concerts By The Sea (Trend, 1979). His album Magic Time (1984) was the first to be credited to his eighteen-piece big band, the Bob Florence Limited Edition. The band released albums throughout the 1980s and 1990s. In 2000, Serendipity 18 won the Grammy Award for Best Jazz Performance by a Large Ensemble. He received fifteen Grammy nominations during his career.

Florence died of pneumonia at the age of 75 on May 15, 2008, in Los Angeles.

== Discography ==
=== As leader ===
Year recorded	Title	Label	Personnel/Notes
1958	Meet the Bob Florence Trio	Era Records EL-20003; CD reissue: Fresh Sound FSRCD-303	
1959	Name Band: 1959	Carlton LP12/115; reissue: Carlton LP12/139 (1962); CD reissue: Fresh Sound FSCD-2008	With big band
1960	Bongos/Reeds/Brass	HiFi Records L-1001; CD reissue: Essential Media Group	With big band
1964	Here and Now! (Bold, Swinging Big Band Ideas)	Liberty LRP-3380/LST-7380	With big band
1967	Pet Project: The Bob Florence Big Band Plays Pet Clark Hits	World Pacific WP-1860/WPS-21860	With big band
1979	Live at Concerts By The Sea	Trend 523	With big band
1981	Westlake	Discovery 832	With big band
1982	Soaring	Bosco 3; CD reissue: Sea Breeze SB-2082	With big band
1984	Magic Time	Trend 536	With big band
1986	The Norwegian Radio Big Band Meets Bob Florence	Odin 18	
1987	Trash Can City	Trend 545	With big band
1988	State of the Art	USA Music Group 589	With big band
1990	Treasure Chest	USA Music Group 680	With big band
1993	Funupsmanship [live]	MAMA 1006	With big band
1995	With All the Bells and Whistles	MAMA 1011	With big band
1997	Earth	MAMA 1016	With big band
1999	Serendipity 18	MAMA 1025	With big band
2001	Another Side	MAMA 1029	Solo piano
2003	Whatever Bubbles Up	Summit 360	With big band
2005	Friends, Treasures, Heroes	Summit 430	Solo piano
2006	Eternal Licks & Grooves	MAMA 1030	With big band
2007	You Will Be My Music	MAMA 1031	Florence (piano) with Annette Sanders (vocals)
2009	Legendary	MAMA 1037	With big band

=== As arranger/conductor ===
With Count Basie

- Basie on the Beatles (Happy Tiger, 1969)

With Louie Bellson

- The Brilliant Bellson Sound (Verve, 1959)
- Big Band Jazz from the Summit (Verve, 1962)

With Harry James

- Harry James...Today! (MGM E/SE-3848, 1960)
- The Solid Gold Trumpet of Harry James (MGM E/SE-4058, 1962)

With Lainie Kazan

- on the songs "Sunny", "An Angel Died", "How Can I Be Sure", and "Flower Child", from the album Love Is Lainie (MGM SE-4496, 1968)

With Sérgio Mendes

- The Great Arrival (Atlantic, 1966)

With Joe Pass

- A Sign of the Times (World Pacific, 1965)

With Bud Shank

- California Dreamin' (World Pacific, 1966)
- Michelle (World Pacific, 1966)
- Bud Shank & the Sax Section (Pacific Jazz, 1966)
- Bud Shank Plays Music from Today's Movies (World Pacific, 1967)

With Si Zentner

- Up A Lazy River (Liberty 1961)
- Mr. Nashville (RCA Victor 1966)

=== As sideman ===
With Julie Andrews

- Love Julie (USA Music Group, 1987)

With Sue Raney

- Sings the Music of Johnny Mandel (Discovery, 1982)
- Ridin' High (Discovery, 1984)
- Flight of Fancy: A Journey of Alan & Marilyn Bergman (Discovery, 1986)

With Brian Swartz Quartet

- Live at the Jazz Bakery (Summit, 2005)

With Bud Shank

- Girl in Love (World Pacific, 1966)
- Taking the Long Way Home (Jazzed Media, 2006)

With Joanie Sommers

- Dream (Discovery, 1980 [rel. 1983])
- Here, There and Everywhere! (Absord [Japan], 2000 [rel. 2004])

== See also ==
- List of jazz arrangers
