= Jack Jones discography =

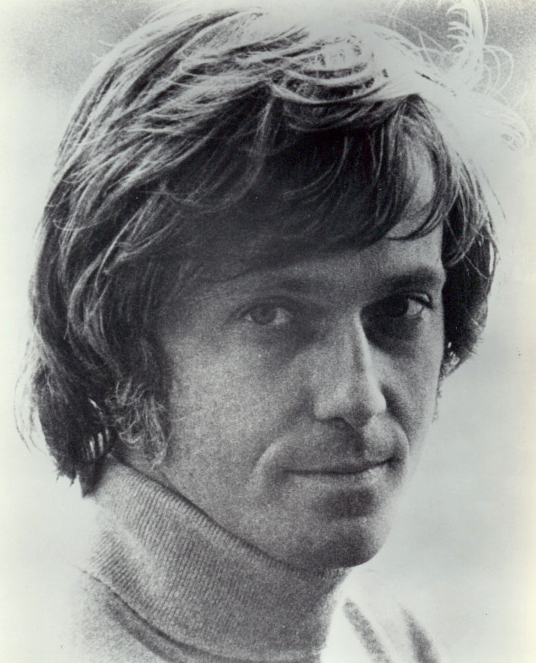
- Studio albums: 57
- Live albums: 3
- Compilation albums: 7
- Singles: 60
- Other charted songs: 5

This is the discography of American pop singer Jack Jones. His first release was in 1957 for Capitol, and he continued recording for various labels until his death in 2024. Jones is regarded as one of the most successful easy listening singers of the 1960s.

Jones' first single was released in 1957 under Capitol, but with no chart success. He continued recording, and in 1962, he received his breakout with the single "Lollipops and Roses", which peaked at No. 6 on the new Easy Listening chart. In 1963 he recorded his most successful single on the Hot 100, "Wives and Lovers", it reached No. 14. With that he released a commercially successful album of the same name. That year he won the Grammy Award for Best Male Pop Vocal Performance for his performance of the single.

His first single to top the Easy Listening chart was released in 1965, "The Race Is On", which also peaked at No. 15 on the Hot 100. The next year he had another single, which topped the chart, soon after that he recorded his most successful American album, The Impossible Dream, which peaked at No. 9 on the Billboard Top LPs. He continued to record with chart success, eventually having four big easy listening hits by 1968. "If You Ever Leave Me" was his last single to enter the Hot 100, peaking at No. 92, and his 1969 album, A Time for Us was his last album to chart in the US. He was included in the soundtrack The Bliss of Mrs. Blossom, released in late 1968.

Jones had some charting singles in the 1970s, all on the AC chart, his last charting single was the theme song for the American television series, The Love Boat, titled "Love Boat". In the 1970s Jones' albums charted only in the United Kingdom, with four top 10 hits there. His album Bread Winners reached No. 7 in the UK and was certified Gold by the BPI – his only album to do so. His last studio album is ArtWork, released in 2023.

== Studio albums ==
=== 1950–1960s ===
List of albums, with selected chart positions, showing other relevant details
Title	Album details	Peak chart positions		
Title	Album details	US 200	US CB	US Christ.
This Love of Mine	Released: 1959; Label: Capitol; Formats: LP	—	—	—
Shall We Dance	With: Billy May; Released: 1961; Label: Kapp; Formats: LP	—	—	—
Lollipops and Roses	Released: 1961; Label: Kapp; Formats: LP	—	—	—
Gift of Love	Released: 1962; Label: Kapp; Formats: LP	—	—	—
I've Got a Lot of Livin' to Do!	Released: 1962; Label: Kapp; Formats: LP	—	—	—
Call Me Irresponsible	Released: May 1963; Label: Kapp; Formats: LP	98	33	—
She Loves Me	Released: 1963; Label: Kapp; Formats: LP	—	43	—
Wives and Lovers	Released: December 1963; Label: Kapp; Formats: LP, 8-track cartridge	18	14	—
Bewitched	Released: May 1964; Label: Kapp; Formats: LP	43	19	—
Where Love Has Gone	Released: 1964; Label: Kapp; Formats: LP	62	22	—
The Jack Jones Christmas Album	Released: 1964; Label: Kapp; Formats: LP	—	—	17
Dear Heart	Released: December 1964; Label: Kapp; Formats: LP	11	12	—
My Kind of Town	Released: 1965; Label: Kapp; Formats: LP	29	31	—
There's Love & There's Love & There's Love	Released: August 1965; Label: Kapp; Formats: LP	86	71	—
Jack Jones	Released: 1965; Label: Sears; Formats: LP	—	—	—
We'll Be Together Again	Released: 1966; Label: Mocambo; Formats: LP	—	—	—
For the "In" Crowd	Released: January 1966; Label: Kapp; Formats: LP	147	102	—
The Impossible Dream	Released: June 1966; Label: Kapp; Formats: LP	9	23	—
Jack Jones Sings	Released: October 1966; Label: Kapp; Formats: LP	75	37	—
Lady	Released: March 1967; Label: Kapp; Formats: LP	23	28	—
Our Song	Released: September 1967; Label: Kapp; Formats: LP, 8-track cartridge	148	71	—
Without Her	Released: November 1967; Label: RCA Victor; Formats: LP	146	66	—
If You Ever Leave Me	Released: February 19, 1968; Label: RCA Victor; Formats: LP, 8-track cartridge	198	60	—
Where Is Love?	Released: August 1968; Label: RCA Victor; Formats: LP, 8-track cartridge	195	104	—
L.A. Break Down	Released: December 27, 1968; Label: RCA Victor; Formats: LP, 8-track cartridge	—	—	—
A Time for Us	Released: July 1969; Label: RCA Victor; Formats: LP, 8-track cartridge	183	—	—
A Jack Jones Christmas	Released: 1969; Label: RCA Victor; Formats: LP, 8-track cartridge	—	—	—

=== 1970s ===
Title	Album details	Peak chart positions	Certification
Title	Album details	UK	Certification
Jack Jones Sings Michel Legrand	Released: 1971; Label: RCA Victor; Formats: LP, 8-track cartridge	—	—N/a
A Song for You	Released: 1972; Label: RCA Victor; Formats: LP	9	—N/a
Bread Winners	Released: 1972; Label: RCA Victor; Formats: LP	7	BPI: Gold
Together	Released: 1973; Label: RCA Victor; Formats: LP	8	—N/a
Christmas with Jack Jones	Released: 1973; Label: RCA Camden; Formats: LP	—	—N/a
Harbour	Released: 1974; Label: RCA Victor; Formats: LP	10	—N/a
What I Did for Love	Released: 1975; Label: RCA Victor; Formats: LP	—	—N/a
Write Me a Love Song, Charlie	Released: 1975; Label: RCA Victor; Formats: LP	—	—N/a
With One More Look at You	Released: 1977; Label: RCA Victor; Formats: LP	—	—N/a
The Full Life	Released: 1977; Label: RCA Victor; Formats: LP	41	—N/a
Nobody Does It Better	Released: 1979; Label: MGM; Formats: LP, cassette	—	—N/a

=== 1980s–2020s ===
Title	Album details	Peak chart positions	Certification
Title	Album details	UK	Certification
Don't Stop Now	Released: 1980; Label: MGM	—	—N/a
I've Been Here All the Time	Released: 1980; Label: Polydor	—	—N/a
Jack Jones	Released: 1982; Label: Applause	—	—N/a
I Am a Singer	Released: 1984; Label: USA Music	—	—N/a
Fire & Rain	Released: 1985; Label: President	—	—N/a
The Gershwin Album	Released: 1992; Label: Columbia	—	—N/a
Chase the Rainbows	Released: 1992; Label: Object	—	—N/a
The Mood Is Love	Released: 1993; Label: Quicksilver	—	—N/a
New Jack Swing	Released: 1997; Label: Linn	—	—N/a
White Christmas	Released: 1998; Label: MCA	—	—N/a
Jack Jones Paints a Tribute to Tony Bennett	Released: October 13, 1998; Label: Honest	— (Note: The album didn't chart on the UK's Album Chart or in the US, but reached No. 17 on the UK Jazz & Blues Albums chart)	—N/a
The Wind Beneath My Wings	Released: 2002; Label: Castle Pulse	—	—N/a
I Never Had It So Good	Released: 2009; Label: Country House	—	—N/a
Love Makes the Changes – The Lyrics of Alan and Marilyn Bergman	Released: 2010; Label: Aspen Records	—	—N/a
Seriously Frank - Celebrating the 100th Birthday of Frank Sinatra	Released: 2015; Label: Aspen Records	—	—N/a
Every Other Day I Have the Blues	Released: 2021; Label: Cavalry Productions	—	—N/a
ArtWork	Released: 2023; Label: Cavalry Productions; With: Joey DeFrancesco	—	—N/a

== Compilation albums ==
Several Jones compilations are noteworthy for either their chart success, as noted by 7 of them listed below, or the material included.

Year	Title	Peak chart positions	
Year	Title	US	UK
1968	What the World Needs Now Is Love!: Label: Kapp	167	—
1968	Curtain Time: Label: Kapp	—	—
1969	Jack Jones in Hollywood: Label: MCA Records	—	—
1978	The Best of Jack Jones: Label: MCA Records	—	—
1984	Magic Moments: Label: MCA Records	—	—
1985	Love Songs: Label: MCA Records	—	—
1986	Golden Classics: Label: MCA Records	—	—
1995	Greatest Hits: Label: MCA Records	—	—

== Live albums ==
Title	Album Information
In Person at the Sands Las Vegas	Released: 1970; Label: RCA Victor; Formats: LP, reel-to-reel; Recorded at: Sands Hotel and Casino
Live at the Sands	Released: 1993; Label: LaserLight; LP, CD: Recorded at: Sands Hotel and Casino
Live in Liverpool	Released: 2013; Label: Aspen Records; Formats: LP, CD; Recorded: Liverpool, UK

== Singles ==
=== 1950s and 1960s ===
List of singles, with selected chart positions, showing other relevant details
Single	Year	Chart positions					Album
Single	Year	US BB	US CB	US AC	CAN RPM	CAN AC	Album
"Baby, Come Home" "Good Luck, Good Buddy"	1957	— —	— —	— —	— —	— —	Non-LP tracks
"Come on Baby, Let's Go" "You Laugh"	1958	— —	— —	— —	— —	— —	This Love of Mine
"A Very Precious Love" "What's The Use?"	1958	— —	— —	— —	— —	— —	Non-LP tracks
"Make Room for the Joy" "When I Love I'll Love Forever"	1959	— —	— —	— —	— —	— —	Non-LP tracks
"Big Time" (With Billy May and His Orchestra) "She's My Darling, She's My Heart" (With Billy May and His Orchestra)	1961	— —	— —	— —	— —	— —	Non-LP tracks
"Lollipops and Roses" "Julie"	1962	66 —	42 —	6 —	— —	— —	Lollipops and Roses
"Gift of Love" "Pick Up The Pieces"	1962	— —	108 —	— —	— —	— —	Gift Of Love
"Poetry" "Dreamin' All the Time"	1962	— —	110 —	— —	— —	— —	Gift Of Love
"I've Got My Pride" "That's Her Little Way"	1962	— —	— —	— —	— —	— —	Non-LP tracks
"The Lonely Bull" "La Paloma"	1963	— —	— —	— —	— —	— —	Non-LP tracks
"Call Me Irresponsible" "Love Song From "Mutiny On The Bounty" (Follow Me)"	1963	75 —	62 —	— —	— —	— —	Call Me Irresponsible
"Love Is a Ticklish Affair" "That's the Way I'll Come to You"	1963	— —	— —	— —	— —	— —	Non-LP tracks
"Wives and Lovers" "Toys in the Attic"	1963	14; 92	12; 115	9 —	— —	— —	Wives and Lovers
"Love with the Proper Stranger" "The Mood I'm In"	1964	62 —	59 —	17 —	— —	— —	Bewitched
"The First Night of the Full Moon" "Far Away"	1964	59 —	62 —	12 —	— —	— —	Non-LP tracks
"Where Love Has Gone" "The Lorelei"	1964	62 —	69 —	12 —	— —	— —	Where Love Has Gone
"Dear Heart" "Emily"	1964	30 —	15 —	6 —	— —	9 —	Dear Heart
"Lullaby For Christmas Eve" "The Village Of St. Bernadette"	1964	— —	— —	— —	— —	— —	The Jack Jones Christmas Album
"The Race Is On" "I Can't Believe I'm Losing You"	1965	15 —	12 —	1 —	12 —	8 —	My Kind of Town
"Seein' the Right Love Go Wrong" "Travellin' On"	1965	46; 132	41 —	9 —	— —	— —	What the World Needs Now Is Love!
"Just Yesterday" "The True Picture"	1965	73; 134	83; 109	5; 27	— —	— —	For the "In" Crowd
"Love Bug" "And I Love Her"	1965	71 —	56 —	5 —	— —	6 —	For the "In" Crowd
"The Weekend" "Wildflower"	1966	123 —	100 —	20 —	— —	— —	For the "In" Crowd
"The Impossible Dream (The Quest)" "Strangers In The Night"	1966	35 —	32 —	1 —	51 —	— —	The Impossible Dream
"A Day in the Life of a Fool" "The Shining Sea"	1966	62 —	55 —	4 —	83 —	— —	Jack Jones Sings
"Lady" "Afraid To Love"	1967	39 —	34 —	1 —	— —	— —	Lady
"I'm Indestructible" "Afterthoughts"	1967	81 —	84 —	— 19	— —	— —	What the World Needs Now Is Love!
"Now I Know" "More and More"	1967	73 —	74 —	3 —	— —	— —	Our Song
"Our Song" "Michelle"	1967	92 —	76 —	13 —	— —	— —	Our Song
"Open for Business as Usual" "The Mood I'm In"	1967	130 —	104 —	26 —	— —	— —	Non-LP tracks
"Live for Life" "There Comes A Time"	1967	99 —	— —	9 —	— —	— —	Without Her
"Oh How Much I Love You" "Don't Give (Your Love Away)"	1967	— —	129 —	— —	— —	— —	Our Song
"If You Ever Leave Me" "Pretty"	1968	92 —	— —	5 —	— —	— —	If You Ever Leave Me
"The Gypsies, the Jugglers and the Clowns" "Brother Where Are You"	1968	— —	134 —	— —	— —	— —	What the World Needs Now Is Love!
"Follow Me" "Without Her"	1968	117 —	— —	20 —	— —	— —	Non-LP tracks
"I Really Want to Know You" "This World Is Yours"	1968	— —	— —	15 —	— —	— —	Where Is Love?
"On My Word" "The Way That I Live"	1968	— —	— —	— 33	— —	— —	Non-LP tracks
"People" "Don't Rain On My Parade"	1968	— —	— —	— —	— —	— —	Curtain Time
"L.A. Break Down (and Take Me In)" "Love Story"	1968	106 —	— —	21 —	— —	— —	L.A. Break Down
"Sweet Child" "The Last Seven Days"	1969	— —	— —	— —	— —	— —	A Time for Us
"It Only Takes A Moment" "Once Upon A Time"	1969	— —	— —	— —	— —	— —	Non-LP tracks
"What's Out There For Me?" "Little Altar Boy"	1969	— —	— —	— —	— —	— —	Non-LP tracks

=== 1970s and 1980s ===
List of singles, with selected chart positions, showing other relevant details
Single	Year	Chart positions		Album
Single	Year	US AC	CAN AC	Album
"Sweet Changes" b/w "I Wish We'd All Been Ready"	1970	24	—	Non-LP tracks
"I Didn't Count on Love" b/w "Does She Ever Think Of Me"	1970	38	—	Non-LP tracks
"Let Me Be the One" b/w "Talk It Over In The Morning"	1971	18	—	A Song For You
"The Kind Of Girl She Is" b/w "What Have They Done To The Moon"	1971	—	—	Non-LP tracks
"That's the Way I've Always Heard It Should Be" (with Susan George) b/w "London Isn't Smiling Anymore"	1972	—	—	Non-LP tracks
"If" b/w "What Have They Done To The Moon"	1972	—	—	Bread Winners
"Games of Magic" b/w "Coming Apart"	1972	—	—	Bread Winners
"My Lonely Room" b/w I Know That One	1973	—	—	Together
"Fools in Love" b/w Do Me Wrong, But Do Me	1974	—	—	Harbour
"She Doesn't Live Here Anymore" b/w "Write Me A Love Song Charlie"	1974	45	—	Write Me A Love Song Charlie
"What I Did for Love" b/w "Don't Mention Love"	1975	25	23	What I Did for Love
"She" b/w "If That's the Way You Want It"	1975	—	—	What I Did for Love
"Once in a While" b/w "Send In The Clowns"	1976	—	—	The Full Life
"With One More Look at You" b/w "Try It Again"	1977	21	27	With One More Look At You
"Dixie Chicken" b/w "Belonging"	1977	—	—	With One More Look At You
"Love Boat Theme" b/w "Ready To Take a Chance Again"	1979	37	—	Nobody Does It Better
"I Could Have Been a Sailor" b/w "Silver Lady"	1979	—	—	Non-LP tracks
"Love Boat Theme" b/w "Reasons"	1982	—	—	Non-LP tracks

=== Year-end charts ===
Single	Year	Rank (Note: The year end lists, see Billboard December, (year end) issues for these rank positions)	
Single	Year	US AC	Hot 100
"The Race Is On"	1965	—	96
"Just Yesterday"	1965	22	—
"Seein' the Right Love Go Wrong"	1965	31	—
"The Impossible Dream (The Quest)"	1966	2	—
"A Day in the Life of a Fool"	1966	76	—
"Lady"	1967	3	—
"Now I Know"	1967	43	—
