= Curtain Time =

Compilation album by Jack Jones
- Released: July 1968
- Recorded: 1960s
- Genre: Vocal pop
- Length: 29 minutes 43 seconds
- Label: Kapp Records

Jack Jones chronology
If You Ever Leave Me (February 1968)	Curtain Time (July 1968)	Where Is Love? (August 1968)

Curtain Time is a compilation album by pop vocalist Jack Jones, released in July 1968 as his third album of the year. It received a positive critical reception but did not chart.

== Background and release ==
By the summer of 1968, Jones had been recording for RCA Victor Records for nearly a year. Kapp Records was his previous label, and they released multiple compilation albums of the recorded material, an example being What the World Needs Now Is Love! which compiled his hits and scored an LP chart entry. Kapp chose older album cuts for Curtain Time, mainly from Where Love Has Gone (1964), but it featured selections from Bewitched (1964), Jack Jones Sings (1966), and I've Got a Lot of Livin' To Do (1962). Released in late July 1968, the album didn't get enough sales to reach the Billboad 200.

== Reception ==
The album received a positive critical reception upon its release. Billboard praised Jones' "Standout performances and arrangements including 'I've Grown Accustomed to Her Face', 'People', and 'Ev'ry Time We Say Goodbye'." Cashbox noted that "Jones lends his warm, romantic voicerto such showstoppers as 'People Will Say Were In Love'...and 'A Lot Of Lovin’ To Do'."

== Track listing ==
Side one
No.	Title	Writer(s)	Length
1.	"People Will Say We're in Love"	Richard Rodgers; Oscar Hammerstein II	1:49
2.	"I See Your Face Before Me"	Arthur Schwartz; Howard Dietz	3:14
3.	"Luck Be a Lady"	Frank Loesser	2:29
4.	"Embraceable You"	George Gershwin; Ira Gershwin	3:32
5.	"I Love Paris"	Cole Porter	2:11
6.	"I've Grown Accustomed to Her Face"	Frederick Loewe; Alan Jay Lerner	3:29

Side two
No.	Title	Writer(s)	Length
7.	"People"	Jule Styne; Bob Merrill	2:22
8.	"Shall We Dance?"	Richard Rodgers; Oscar Hammerstein II	2:02
9.	"It Never Entered My Mind"	Richard Rodgers; Lorenz Hart	2:32
10.	"A Lot of Livin' to Do"	Charles Strouse; Lee Adams	2:31
11.	"Ev'ry Time We Say Goodbye"	Cole Porter	2:55
Total length:			29:43
