= Call Me Irresponsible and the Jack Jones Hits =

Compilation album by Jack Jones
- Released: May 1963
- Recorded: 1961; 1962; 1963
- Genre: Traditional pop; Easy listening
- Length: 34 minutes 13 seconds
- Label: Kapp; KL 1328 (M); KS 3328 (S)

Jack Jones chronology
| I've Got a Lot of Livin' to Do! (1962) | Call Me Irresponsible and the Jack Jones Hits (1963) | Wives and Lovers (1963) |

Singles from Call Me Irresponsible
- 1. "Lollipops and Roses" Released: November 1961; 2. "Call Me Irresponsible" Released: February 1963

Professional ratings
Review scores
| Source | Rating |
|---|---|
| AllMusic | 3/5 stars |
| The Encyclopedia of Popular Music | 3/5 stars |
| Billboard | Positive (Spotlight Pick) |
| Cashbox | Positive (Pop Pick) |

Call Me Irresponsible and the Jack Jones Hits is a compilation album by American singer Jack Jones released in mid 1963 by Kapp Records.

== Background and content ==
Call Me Irresponsible and the Jack Jones Hits was the second of three albums that Jones released in 1963, with it released shortly after namesake minor pop hit single "Call Me Irresponsible", a song which had won the Academy Award for Best Original Song. Despite its easy listening style, it did not chart on the Billboard Easy Listening chart. The album was issued by Kapp Records, and was available both in stereo and mono. The orchestra was directed by Pete King. The album featured the aforementioned minor pop hit single and the older Lollipops and Roses single, which had won him the Grammy Award for Best Male Pop Vocal Performance. "Julie" was also the flip for the latter. Those three songs, as well as "This Was My Love" by Jim Harbert were the only Jones originals on the album; the rest of it included cover songs of older standards lifted from his previous LPs.

== Reception ==
The album received a positive reception. Billboard stated that "Jack Jones, a singer of the quality school, has stirred substantial action with several singles," believing "...This album might be just the thing to make him step out in big-time fashion. It has the two hits, plus a lot of smoothies like "Moonlight Becomes You," "They Didn't Believe Me" and "My Romance." Concluding that it's a "Delightful wax in the class groove with fine support by Pete King's ork." Cashbox magazine said that "Jones, currently riding the Top 100 with his hit single, “Call Me Irresponsible,” cashes in on the success of the biggie to tag this new Kapp LP outing. The songster also includes here his while-back blockbuster, “Lollipops And Roses” along with such melodic goodies as “Moonlight Becomes You” and “You Stepped Out of a Dream”, noting that the "crooner's warm, intimate delivery of these tunes should carry the LP to hitsville in short order". Both The Encyclopedia of Popular Music and AllMusic gave the album a three-star rating as well.

== Chart performance ==
Following its release, Call Me Irresponsible and the Jack Jones Hits was reported getting strong sales action by dealers in major markets. The LP had also become his first to appear on the charts. The album debuted on Billboard magazine's Top LP's chart in the issue dated June 29, 1963, peaking at No. 98 during a twenty-five-week run on the chart. It debuted earlier on Cashbox magazine's Top 100 Albums chart, in the issue dated May 16, 1963, and was ranked much higher, peaking at No. 33 during a fourteen-week run on the chart.

== Track listing ==
Side one
| No. | Title | Writer(s) | Length |
|---|---|---|---|
| 1. | "Call Me Irresponsible" | Jimmy Van Heusen; Sammy Cahn | 3:08 |
| 2. | "There Will Never Be Another You" | Harry Warren; Mack Gordon | 2:48 |
| 3. | "This Was My Love" | Jim Harbert | 3:02 |
| 4. | "They Didn't Believe Me" | Jerome Kern; Herbert Reynolds | 3:36 |
| 5. | "Moonlight Becomes You" | Jimmy Van Heusen; Johnny Burke | 3:21 |

Side two
| No. | Title | Writer(s) | Length |
|---|---|---|---|
| 6. | "Lollipops and Roses" | Tony Velona | 4:03 |
| 7. | "Love Letters" | Victor Young; Edward Heyman | 3:42 |
| 8. | "My Romance" | Richard Rodgers; Lorenz Hart | 3:05 |
| 9. | "Julie" | Allan; Greene | 3:44 |
| 10. | "You Stepped Out of a Dream" | Nacio Herb Brown; Gus Kahn | 3:39 |
| Total length: | | | 34:13 |

== Charts ==
=== Album ===
| Chart (1963) | Peak position |
|---|---|
| US Billboard Top LP's | 98 |
| US Cashbox Top 100 Albums | 33 |

=== Singles ===
| Single | Year | Chart | Peak position |
|---|---|---|---|
| "Lollipops and Roses" | 1962 | US Billboard Hot 100 | 66 |
| "Lollipops and Roses" | 1962 | US Cashbox Top 100 Singles | 42 |
| "Lollipops and Roses" | 1962 | US Easy Listening | 6 |
| "Call Me Irresponsible" | 1963 | US Billboard Hot 100 | 75 |
| "Call Me Irresponsible" | 1963 | US Cashbox Top 100 Singles | 62 |
