= A Time for Us (Jack Jones album) =

Studio album by Jack Jones
- Released: July 1969
- Recorded: Summer 1969
- Studios: RCA Victor's Music Center of the World, Hollywood, California
- Genres: Vocal pop; Country-pop; Pop; Soft rock
- Length: 33 minutes 15 seconds
- Labels: RCA Victor; LSP-4209
- Producer: Jack Pleis

Jack Jones chronology
L.A. Break Down (1968)	A Time for Us (1969)	A Jack Jones Christmas (1969)

Singles from A Time for Us
- 1. "The Last Seven Days" Released: June 1969

A Time for Us is the twenty-seventh studio album by American pop vocalist Jack Jones, released in July 1969 by RCA Victor. The contemporary-pop-inspired project included a mixture of original and cover songs. The album reached the US charts and received a positive reception.

== Background ==
Jack Jones was a popular easy listening singer in the 1960s, recording with Kapp Records and gaining several hits. In 1967 he switched to RCA Victor Records and released Without Her. Although featuring new pop hits, it also included standards as did his Kapp LPs. Succeeding albums would be similar in format. In 1969, after Jones' chart performance declined, he shifted towards new material. A Time for Us signaled this change. It was the first RCA Victor album that Jones recorded without producer Ernie Altschuler.

== Recording and content ==
The recordings for A Time for Us were taken from sessions held in the summer of 1969. The sessions took place at RCA Victor's Music Center of the World, located in Hollywood, California. The sessions were produced by Jack Pleis. The album consisted of 11 tracks. Whilst the album consisted of contemporary pop material, music publications of the time noted that it had a "flavor" of country and had semi-rock tracks. Arrangements were provided by Steve Atkin, Jimmie Haskell, Al Capps, Shorty Rogers, and Ralph Carmichael.

One of the lesser-known covers Jones cut for the album was "Isn't It Lonely Together". It was a minor pop hit for Robert Knight the year before. "Easy to Be Hard" was a song from the 1967 rock musical Hair. Jones himself is credited with writing "Sweet Child", one of the only originals on the project. Other selections included "A Time For Us", from the 1968 film Romeo and Juliet and "I'll Never Fall in Love Again", from the 1968 musical Promises, Promises. "I Keep Leavin' Houses Behind" was co-written by Larry Marks, a producer at A&M Records whose hit "L.A. Break Down (and Take Me In)" Jones recorded the previous year as well. "Spinning Wheel" was the current hit of the year with the version by Blood, Sweat & Tears reaching chart topping positions.

== Release and reception ==
Professional ratings
Review scores
Source	Rating
The Encyclopedia of Popular Music	2/5 stars
Record World	Positive (Pick Hit)
Billboard	Positive (Billboard Pick)
Cashbox	Positive (Pop Pick)

A Time for Us was originally released in July 1969 on the RCA Victor label. It was the twenty-seventh, the second of the year, studio collection released in Jones' career. The album was distributed as a vinyl LP, containing five songs on side one and six on the side two of the record. In August of that year it was also issued as an 8 track cartridge. Decades later, the album was re-released on Sony Music Entertainment to digital and streaming sites.

The album received a positive critical reception upon its release. Billboard magazine praised Jones' "vocal best" on tracks such as the opener "I'll Never fall in Love Again," "Spinning Wheel" and his current single "The Last Seven Days." They noted that the "poignant 'Easy to Be Hard' comes off well as does a new ballad 'And I'll Go'". Cashbox reviewed the LP the same week and believed that "there's a pleasant, slight country flavor to some of the material on Jack Jones' latest album." They stated that the "Performance is lively and original on such semi-rock selections as 'Easy to Be Hard,' 'Spinning Wheel,'" as well as highlighting the "well-delivered, message-laden" "The Last Seven Days." 'Cashbox also noted that "Sweet Child" is a smooth ballad.

Record World magazine described the effort as "Nice, rough-smooth work", noting that Jones "kept up with the times". The San Antonio Express called it a "typical quality recording" from Jones. They believed that the "absorbing message tune", "The Last Seven Days" is the best selection.

== Chart performance ==
The album debuted on Billboard magazine's Top LP's chart in the issue dated August 16, 1969, peaking at No. 183 during a four-week run on the chart. "The Last Seven Days" was issued as a single, but it did not reach the charts.

== Track listings ==
=== Vinyl version ===
Side one
No.	Title	Writer(s)	Length
1.	"I'll Never Fall in Love Again"	Burt Bacharach; Hal David	3:27
2.	"Sweet Child"	Jack Jones	2:52
3.	"Easy to Be Hard"	Galt MacDermot; James Rado; Gerome Ragni	3:04
4.	"Josephine for Better or for Worse"	Dave Cousins	2:46
5.	"Spinning Wheel"	David Clayton-Thomas	2:35

Side two
No.	Title	Writer(s)	Length
1.	"A Time for Us"	Nino Rota; Larry Kusik; Eddie Snyder	2:48
2.	"Isn't It Lonely Together"	Ray Stevens	3:03
3.	"I Keep Leavin' Houses Behind"	John Allan Jones; Larry Marks	3:01
4.	"The Last Seven Days"	Karen Hille; John Moring	4:00
5.	"And I'll Go"	Sonny Curtis	2:09
6.	"Home"	Marks; Maxwell	3:19

=== Digital version ===
A Time for Us (download and streaming)
No.	Title	Writer(s)	Length
1.	"I'll Never Fall in Love Again"	Burt Bacharach; Hal David	3:19
2.	"Sweet Child"	Jack Jones	2:53
3.	"Easy to Be Hard"	Galt MacDermot; James Rado; Gerome Ragni	3:06
4.	"Josephine for Better or for Worse"	Dave Cousins	2:48
5.	"Spinning Wheel"	David Clayton-Thomas	2:37
6.	"A Time for Us"	Nino Rota; Larry Kusik; Eddie Snyder	2:51
7.	"Isn't It Lonely Together"	Ray Stevens	3:06
8.	"I Keep Leavin' Houses Behind"	Jones; Marks	3:00
9.	"The Last Seven Days"	Karel Hille; John Moring	4:01
10.	"And I'll Go"	Sonny Curtis	2:11
11.	"Home"	Marks; Maxwell	3:18
Total length:			33:15

== Personnel ==
All credits are adapted from the liner notes of A Time for Us.

- Jack Pleis – producer
- Jimmie Haskell, (tracks: B5) – arranger, brass & string
- Steve Atkin, (tracks: A5, B5, B6) – arranger, conductor
- Al Capps, (tracks: A1, B2) – arranger, conductor
- Shorty Rogers, (tracks: B3, B5) – arranger, conductor
- Ralph Carmichael, (tracks: A2, A3, A4, B1) – arranger, conductor
- Mickey Crofford – recording engineer
- Frank Bez – photography

== Chart performance ==
Chart peaks for A Time for Us
Chart (1969)	Peak position
US Billboard Top LP's	183

== Release history ==
Region	Date	Format	Label	Ref.
United States	August 1969	8-track cartridge tape	RCA Victor Records	
North America and UK	July 1969	LP; Vinyl	RCA Victor Records	
North America and UK	Circa 2020	Music download; streaming	Sony Music	
