= Bread Winners (album) =

Studio album by Jack Jones
- Released: May 1972
- Studios: RCA's Music Center of the World, Hollywood, California
- Genres: Pop; easy listening; soft rock
- Labels: RCA Victor (SF8280; LSP 4692)
- Producer: Joe Reisman

Jack Jones chronology
A Song for You (1972)	Bread Winners (1972)	Together (1973)

Singles from Bread Winners
- 1. "Games of Magic" Released: June 1972

Professional ratings
Review scores
Source	Rating
The Encyclopedia of Popular Music	3/5 stars

Bread Winners is a studio album by American singer Jack Jones released in early 1972 by RCA Victor Records. The album was released as a tribute to the American soft rock group Bread. It brought Jones to the UK pop top-10 right after his previous album.

== Background ==
Jack Jones was a popular easy listening and pop singer in the 1960s, recording with Kapp Records and gaining several hits. In late 1967 he moved over to RCA Victor and started recording more contemporary material, starting with the album Without Her. Jones would continue with material like this up to 1972 as well, with several charting albums. Even before Bread Winners, Jones performed Bread material like "Baby I'm-A Want You" and "If", eventually culminating into an album.

== Release and content ==
Bread Winners was the second of three albums Jones recorded in 1972, recorded in the spring. It followed the highly successful A Song for You. The album was dedicated to the group Bread, with the single and album being primarily cover songs of Bread's hit singles. A lead single titled "Games of Magic" was released in June 1972, paired with "Coming Apart". Both songs were from the LP. While it did not chart, Cashbox said that it's a "Lesser known Bread slice given the fine Jones touch," noting that "MOR's could hardly ask for more." The album was reissued in 1982 under RCA International.

== Chart performance ==
The album debuted on the United Kingdom Official Albums Chart in the issue dated June 3, 1972, breaking into the top-10 and reaching No. 7 during a thirty-six-week run on the chart. Reaching its peak position in mid June, it became his best-charting album in his career. Bread Winners dropped out of the charts completely in early 1973. The album was certified to as having over 100,000 sales, and was certified Gold in the UK.

== Reception ==
The album received a positive critical reception upon its release. Billboard stated that "The first concept package of beautiful material penned by David Gates and made into giant hits by Bread, is one of the finest and most commercial Jones albums." The publication noted that "Jones is at his best with sensitive readings of 'If,' 'Everything I Own,' 'Make It With You,' 'Baby I'm-a Want You,' and the current smash hit of Bread, 'Diary.' This one should prove a giant programmer that will induce heavy sales for Jones."

One of the mentioned Bread's members, David Gates, said that he was "impressed and flattered" by the album and that the album is special, because it was the first album dedicated to their songs, adding "Most of all it's special because Jack rendered such beautifully sincere interpretations of the songs – and it's special because its gifted producer (Joe Reisman) and I have known each other for a long time, and he wanted to do his finest work to please an old friend. I can assure you, he succeeded."

== Track listing ==
Bread Winners track listing

All tracks are written by David Gates, except where noted.

Side one
No.	Title	Writer(s)	Arranged by	Length
1.	"Make It with You"		Harry Betts	2:18
2.	"Baby I'm-A Want You"		Larry Muhoberac	2:21
3.	"Coming Apart"	Griffin, Royer	Harry Betts	3:30
4.	"If"		Harry Betts	3:27
5.	"Daughter"		Joe Kloess	3:09

All tracks are written by David Gates, except where noted.

Side two
No.	Title	Writer(s)	Arranged by	Length
6.	"Games of Magic"	Griffin, Royer	Harry Betts	2:37
7.	"Everything I Own"		Harry Betts	2:56
8.	"Diary"		Harry Betts	3:30
9.	"It Don't Matter to Me"		Larry Muhoberac	2:33
10.	"Come Again"		Larry Muhoberac	2:16

== Personnel ==
All credits are adapted from the liner notes of Bread Winners.

- Jack Jones – vocals
- Harry Betts – arranger, conductor
- Larry Muhoberac – arranger, conductor
- Mickey Crofford – arranger, mixing engineer
- Joe Kloess – arranger, conductor, piano
- Rick Ruggieri – recording engineer
- Ken Whitmore – cover photo
- Frank Bez – liner photo
- Chuck Hughes – drums
- Chino Valdes – congas
- Bob Thomas – guitar
- Steve Swallow – bass

== Charts ==
Chart peaks for Bread Winners
Chart (1972)	Peak position
UK Official Albums Chart	7

== Certification ==
Region	Certification	Certified units/sales
United Kingdom (BPI)	Gold	100,000^{^}
^{^} Shipments figures based on certification alone.
