= What the World Needs Now Is Love! =

Compilation album by Jack Jones
- Released: January 1968
- Recorded: Late 1960s
- Genres: Vocal pop; Easy listening
- Length: 29 minutes 43 seconds
- Labels: Kapp Records; KL 1551, KS 3551
- Producer: Michael Kapp

Jack Jones chronology
Without Her (1967)	What the World Needs Now Is Love! (1968)	If You Ever Leave Me (1968)

Singles from What the World Needs Now Is Love!
- 1. "Seein' The Right Love Go Wrong" Released: May 1964; 2. "I'm Indestructible" Released: April 1967; 3. "The Gypsies, the Jugglers and the Clowns" Released: February 1968

Professional ratings
Review scores
Source	Rating
The Encyclopedia of Popular Music	3/5 stars
Billboard	Positive (Spotlight)
Cashbox	Positive (Pop Pick)

What the World Needs Now Is Love! is a compilation album by pop vocalist Jack Jones, released in January 1968 as his first album of the year. It received a positive critical reception and reached the charts.

== Background and release ==
By the winter of 1968, Jones had been recording for RCA Victor Records for a few months. Kapp Records was his previous label, and What the World Needs Now Is Love! was the first compilation album they released after Jones moved to RCA. Offered as a vinyl LP, it was available both in mono and stereo. Kapp chose recent hits and older album cuts for the track listing. Released in January 1968, the album went on to sell well. "I'm Indestructible" and "Afterthoughts" were singles hits, the title track and "Yesterday" were lifted from his 1966 LP For the "In" Crowd. The album included three singles and one flip side. For instance, "Seein' the Right Love Go Wrong" was another minor pop hit and major easy listening hit earlier in the decade.

== Reception ==
The album received a positive critical reception upon its release. Billboard praised Jones' "top" covers of "Yesterday" and "True Love." They stated that "Jones never lets go on this LP, from the opening title tune to the oldie 'I Only Have Eyes for You.' He shapes each song with style and excellent phrasing while backed up by some spirited arranging." Cashbox believed that the album "contains eleven pearls that anyone would be glad to possess. A feelingful performance of the title tune starts things off and establishes the theme of the set, which is, of course, love. The various aspects, happy and sad, of amour are explored in the ten remaining tracks."

== Chart performance ==
The album debuted on Billboard magazine's Top LP's chart in the issue dated February 24, 1968, peaking at No. 167 during a six-week run on the chart.

"Seein' The Right Love Go Wrong" had reached the top-ten on the Billboard Easy Listening in 1964. "I'm Indestructible" (1967) debuted on the Billboard Hot 100 in the issue dated April 15, 1967, peaking at number 81 during a seven-week run. The track debuted on the Cashbox singles chart in the issue dated April 22, 1964, peaking at number 84 during a four-week run. The B-side "Afterthoughts" on the other hand debuted on the magazine's Easy Listening chart on May 6, peaking at number 19 during a seven-week run. "The Gypsies, the Jugglers and the Clowns" was released as a single concurrently with the LP, reaching No. 134 nationally.

== Track listing ==
Side one
No.	Title	Writer(s)	Length
1.	"What the World Needs Now Is Love"	Burt Bacharach; Hal David	3:10
2.	"Afterthoughts"	Bob Hilliard; Jack DePaul	2:31
3.	"I'm Indestructible"	Mark Barkan; Vic Millrose	2:27
4.	"I Never Go There Anymore"	Marty Paich; Rod McKuen	3:38
5.	"The One I Love Belongs to Somebody Else"	Gus Kahn; Isham Jones	2:44

Side two
No.	Title	Writer(s)	Length
6.	"The Eyes of Love"	Buddy Kaye; Isham Jones	2:34
7.	"True Love"	Cole Porter	2:30
8.	"Yesterday"	Lennon–McCartney	2:21
9.	"The Gypsies, the Jugglers and the Clowns"	Johnny Mandel; Norman Sachs	2:27
10.	"Seein' the Right Love Go Wrong"	Aaron Schroeder; Joseph Brooks	2:31
11.	"I Only Have Eyes for You"	Harry Warren; Al Dubin	1:46
Total length:			30:39

== Charts ==
=== Album ===
Chart peaks for What the World Needs Now Is Love!
Chart (1968)	Peak position
US Billboard Top LP's	167

=== Singles ===
Single	Year	Chart	Peak position
"Seein' The Right Love Go Wrong"	1964	US Billboard Hot 100	41
"Seein' The Right Love Go Wrong"	1964	US Cashbox Top 100 Singles	46
"Seein' The Right Love Go Wrong"	1964	US Easy Listening	9
"I'm Indestructible"	1967	US Billboard Hot 100	81
"I'm Indestructible"	1967	US Cashbox Top 100 Singles	84
"Afterthoughts"	1967	US Easy Listening	19
"The Gypsies, the Jugglers and the Clowns"	1968	US Cashbox Top 100 Singles	134
