= Now I Know (Eddie Fisher song) =

1967 single by Eddie Fisher

Single by Eddie Fisher
- B-side: "I Haven't Got Anything Better to Do"
- Released: Early May 1967
- Genre: Vocal pop; Easy Listening
- Label: RCA Victor
- Songwriters: James Last, Stanley Jay Gelber & Scott English
- Producer: Al Schmitt

Eddie Fisher singles chronology
"People Like You" (1967)	"Now I Know" (1967)	"I'll Pick a Rose for My Rose" (1969)

"Now I Know"

Single by Jack Jones

from the album Our Song
- B-side: "More and More"
- Released: Late May 1967
- Genre: Traditional pop; Easy listening
- Label: Kapp; Cat. 833
- Songwriters: James Last, Stanley Jay Gelber & Scott English
- Producer: Dave Kapp

Jack Jones singles chronology
"I'm Indestructible" (1967)	"Now I Know" (1967)	"Our Song" (1967)

Professional ratings
Review scores
Source	Rating
Record World	4/5 stars
Billboard	Positive (Spotlight)
Cashbox	Positive (Pick of the Week)

"Now I Know" is a 1967 song written by Stanley Jay Gelber and Scott English. It was most notably released as a single by Eddie Fisher and later Jack Jones, both in May 1967. The song was composed by James Last, who would include an instrumental version of the song in his 1967 Games That Lovers Play album.

== Eddie Fisher's original ==
=== Release and reception ===
After the modest success with "People Like You", Eddie Fisher recorded "Now I Know" with "I Haven't Got Anything Better to Do" written by Lee Pockriss and Paul Vance as the B-side in early 1967. The flip was lifted from his People Like You album released the same month. The songs were produced by Al Schmitt, with arrangements by Claus Ogerman and Marty Manning.

The single gained short, but positive reviews upon its release. Record World put the single in its "Single Picks of the Week", and wrote: "Eddie Fisher makes it three in a row with 'Now I Know,' a tearful, sentimental ballad," and added that "It is the kind of single that makes good music better." Cashbox said that the single had "noisemaking offerings", noting that "Middle of-the-roaders should dig this pretty, swaying charmer." The described the flip as a "melancholy ballad" as well.

=== Chart performance ===
In the summer of 1967, the track reached No. 23 on the Billboard Easy Listening chart. On Record World's Top Non-Rock, the song peaked at No. 19, and on the magazine's Up-Coming Singles chart the song peaked at No. 14, (No. 114 with the 100 Top Pops). William Ruhlmann of AllMusic commented that "'People Like You' barely registered on the pop charts," and that "'Now I Know' got even less attention in the spring." It was his last charting single, and his recording career basically came to an end, with Fisher only recording a tribute album You Ain't Heard Nothin' Yet the next year.

== Jack Jones version ==
=== Release and reception ===
In early 1967 Jack Jones topped the Easy Listening chart with "Lady" composed by Bert Kaempfert. Wanting to repeat the success, he recorded another song composed by a well-known German composer, James Last, with "Now I Know". The flip was written by Tommy Karen, Allan Reuss and Rainey Robinson, and titled "More and More". The songs were produced by Dave Kapp himself, with arrangements by Ralph Carmichael and Bob Florence. The single itself was released in late May 1967, with the catalogue number 833.

The single received a positive critical reception. Billboard magazine stated that the tracks are "Two powerful sides, both loaded with programming and top sales potential. First is a smooth, lush treatment of the beautiful James Last ballad from Germany." They noted that the "Flip is a top rendition of the much-recorded easy swinger with equal potential. Record World put the single in its "Song of the Week" singles section, believing that it's a "pretty ballad Jack does for plenty of summer interest." Cashbox said that "Vet songster Jones is in a strong position to score a big one with the gentle, lyrical 'Now I Know.'" They also wrote that the song "should get plenty of spins and sales. On the other side, 'More And More' offers a rhythmic blues tinged romancer".

=== Chart performance ===
Jones's version peaked at No. 73 on the Billboard Hot 100 and No. 3 on the Easy Listening chart. The single was also ranked at No. 43 on the Easy Listening chart's year-end top 50 list. The track debuted on Cashbox magazine's Top 100 Singles chart in the issue dated June 3, 1967, reaching No. 74 during a seven-week run on it. It debuted on Record World magazine's Top Non-Rock chart at the same time, peaking at No. 3. It appeared on the magazine's Pop Singles charts on June 17, reaching No. 72 after two weeks.

After his next single, "Our Song", did well on the charts, Jones recorded an album with the same name, which included "Now I Know" and its B-side.

== Charts ==
Picture of Fisher in 1967, used in an ad to promote the single

"Now I Know" by Eddie Fisher
Chart (1967)	Peak position
US Billboard Bubbling Under the Hot 100	131
US Billboard Easy Listening	23
US Cashbox Looking Ahead	135
US Record World Up Coming Singles	114
US Record World Top Non-Rock	19

"Now I Know" by Jack Jones
Chart (1967)	Peak position
US Billboard Hot 100	73
US Billboard Easy Listening	3
US Cashbox Top 100 Singles	74
US Record World 100 Top Pops	72
US Record World Top Non-Rock	3
