= Jack Jones (American singer) =

American singer and actor (1938–2024)

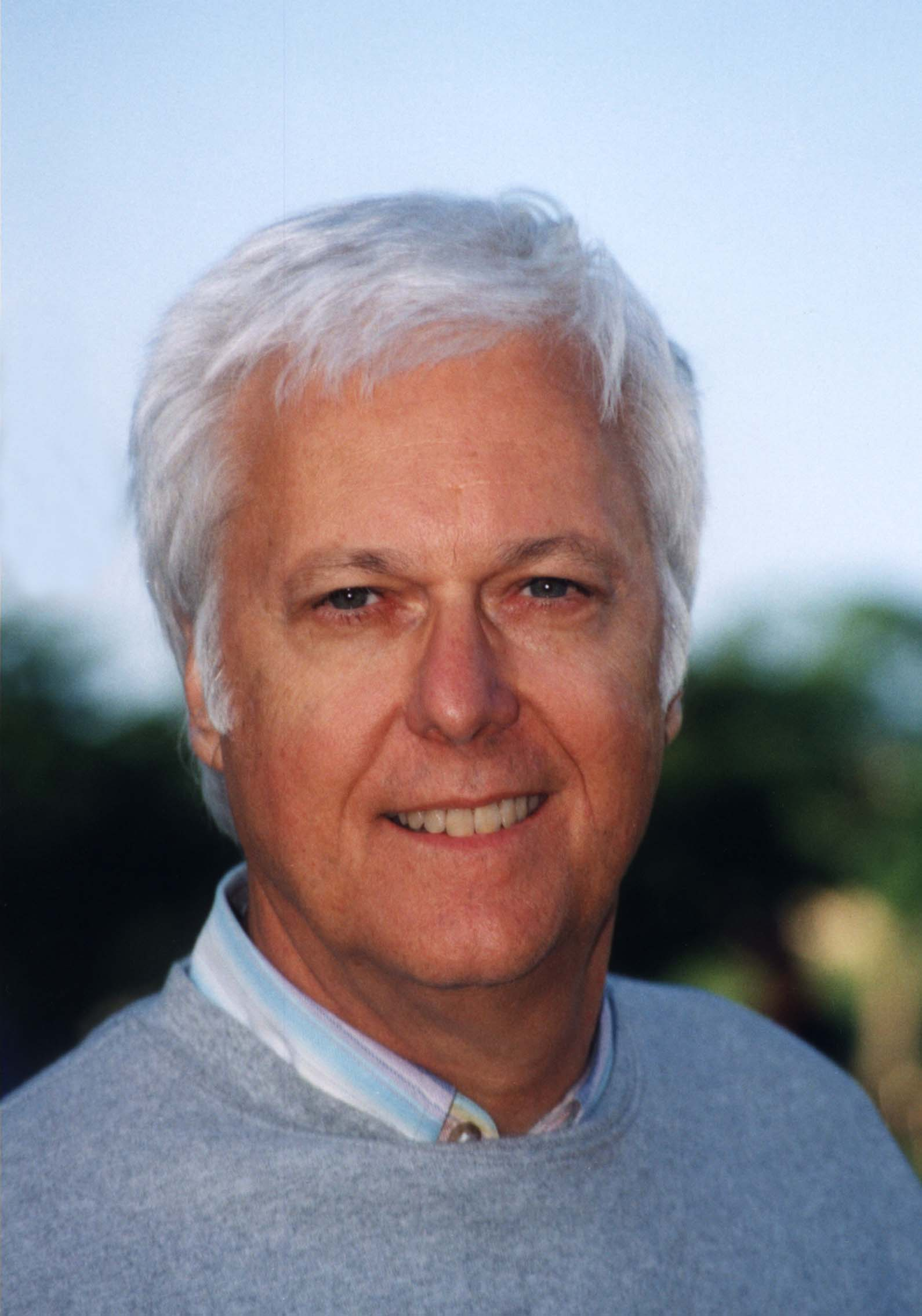
- Jones in 1999

Background information
- Born: John Allan Jones; January 14, 1938; Los Angeles, California, U.S.
- Died: October 23, 2024 (aged 86) Rancho Mirage, California, U.S.
- Genres: Traditional pop; jazz; big band; easy listening
- Occupations: Singer; actor
- Instrument: Vocals
- Years active: 1958–2024
- Labels: Capitol; Kapp; RCA Victor; MGM
- Spouses: Lee Larance (m. 1960; div. 1966); Jill St. John (m. 1967; div. 1969); Gretchen Roberts (m. 1970; div. 1971); Kathy Simmons (m. 1977; div. 1982); Kim Ely (m. 1982; div. 2005); Eleanora Peters (m. 2009)

John Allan Jones (January 14, 1938 – October 23, 2024) was an American singer and actor. He was primarily a straight-pop singer (even when he recorded contemporary material) whose forays into jazz were mostly of the big-band/swing music variety. He won two Grammy Awards and received five additional nominations. Notably, he sang the opening theme song for the television series The Love Boat.

Jones continued to perform concerts around the world and in Las Vegas. His most popular recordings include "Lollipops and Roses", "Call Me Irresponsible", "Wives and Lovers", "The Race Is On", "A Day in the Life of a Fool", and "The Impossible Dream". He also sang the opening theme for the 1968 war film Anzio ("This World Is Yours") as well as the title song for the 1963 film Love with the Proper Stranger, which played on a radio in the film contributing to the storyline.

== Musical career ==
=== 1938–1960: Early years and Capitol Records ===
Jack Jones was born in Hollywood, California, the morning after his father, Allan, recorded his signature song "The Donkey Serenade", for RCA Victor, resulting in the younger Jones' assertion that he was "practically born in a trunk." Jack attended University High School in West Los Angeles and studied drama and singing. His mother was actress Irene Hervey.

Jack Jones' first professional break was with his father, who was performing at the Thunderbird Hotel and Casino in Las Vegas. Jack recorded several demos for songwriter Don Raye, attracting attention from the music industry. In 1959, he was signed to Capitol Records and released the album This Love of Mine and a few singles. The album was a flop, and the label dropped him soon after.

=== 1961–1967: Years at Kapp ===
While performing at a San Francisco nightclub, Jack Jones was heard by Pete King, a producer and artist for Kapp Records, who quickly signed him to the label. In August 1961, Jones recorded the ballad "Lollipops and Roses" written by Tony Velona, which became his first hit the next year. His biggest pop hit was "Wives and Lovers" in 1963, written by Burt Bacharach and Hal David. Both recordings earned him Grammy Awards for Best Vocal Performance, Male. The album Wives and Lovers was successfully released while the title track was still on the singles charts.

Kapp arranged for Jones to work with arranger Billy May for the LP Shall We Dance in 1961. Around this time, he recorded several albums like I've Got a Lot of Living to Do! and This Was My Love, but none of them reached the charts. Academy Award-winning "Call Me Irresponsible" became the title track for Jones' 1963 album Call Me Irresponsible. Where Love Has Gone and Bewitched followed their respective singles' success, both of which were taken from the movies. Dear Heart was released the next year and became his best charting album, nearly reaching the top-10 on the Billboard Top LPs. My Kind of Town, The Impossible Dream were roughly in the same style, the latter actually breaking into the top-10. For the "In" Crowd (in the title track providing vocal lyrics to Ramsey Lewis's earlier famous jazz instrumental version of 1965) was Jones' attempt at reaching the modern market via recording popular songs of the time. His next albums Jack Jones Sings and Lady received a positive critical reception.

Besides the choice of material, he worked with arrangers and conductors like Billy May, Nelson Riddle, Marty Paich, Shorty Rogers, Jack Elliott, Ralph Carmichael, Bob Florence, and Don Costa.

His final studio album for Kapp was Our Song, released shortly after the title track reached the pop charts. The label would continue issuing Jones' material in multiple compilation albums, such as Curtain Time and What the World Needs Now Is Love!, the latter of which saw commercial success. During the years Jones was with Kapp, he recorded nearly twenty albums for them.

=== 1967–1980: Years at RCA Victor and MGM ===
Jones moved from Kapp (London Records in the United Kingdom) to RCA Victor in late 1967. His first album for the label was Without Her. The releases If You Ever Leave Me, Where Is Love?, and L.A. Break Down which followed, were in roughly the same style of the Kapp records, but with a somewhat more contemporary vocal styling. Jones would switch from recording standards, with the only notable exception being "Old Man River" in 1968. A Time for Us (1969) was one of the albums that marked his transition toward a more middle-of-the-road sound. He began recording more contemporary material including covers of such well-known songwriters as Randy Newman, Harry Nilsson, Carole King, Paul Williams, Richard Carpenter, Gordon Lightfoot, and Gilbert O'Sullivan.

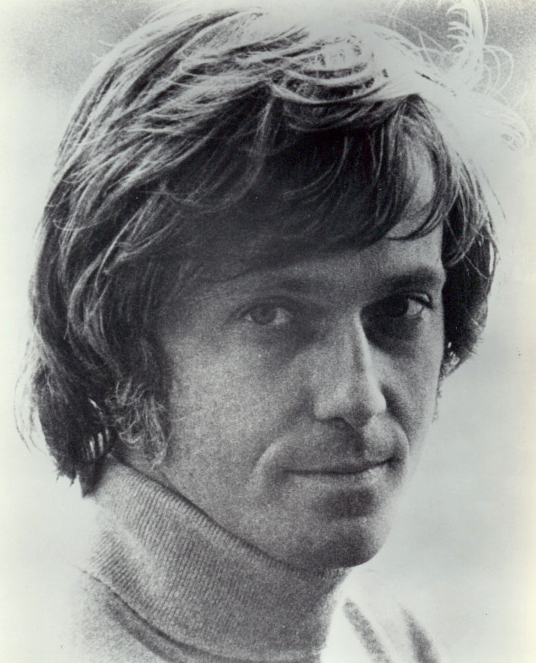
A Jones headshot for RCA Records, 1960s

The album Bread Winners (1972) was a tribute to the band Bread, with eight songs written by David Gates and two by Jimmy Griffin and Robb Royer. Two more albums from this period were dedicated to two French songwriters: Jack Jones Sings Michel Legrand (to Michel Legrand, 1971) and Write Me a Love Song, Charlie, featuring songs by Charles Aznavour (1974).

The Full Life (1977) was produced by Jones and Bruce Johnston of the Beach Boys; on the album, Jones recorded the Beach Boys classics "God Only Knows" and "Disney Girls". His last LP for RCA was With One More Look at You (1977), which includes a rendition of the Little Feat hit "Dixie Chicken"; this performance later resurfaced on Golden Throats 2: More Celebrity Rock Oddities. In 1979 he moved to MGM Records, recording the album Nobody Does It Better, which featured a disco version of "The Love Boat", the opening theme from The Love Boat, and his Grammy winner "Wives and Lovers". His second (and due to MGM's closure, his last) MGM album, Don't Stop Now, features duets with singer Maureen McGovern

=== 1981–2018: Later years ===
After 1980 Jones recorded few albums and performed in various concert arenas and occasionally appeared on the supper-club circuit. He released the album Live at the London Palladium in 1995, recorded in London on the Emporio label. He received recognition in Japan, where many of his earlier records were released on CD. In 1982 he recorded an album for Applause Records, covering songs by the Beatles, Billy Joel, and the Eagles.

Jones released I Am a Singer in 1987 for USA Records, and in 1992 he recorded The Gershwin Album for Sony Music, with songs written by George Gershwin and Ira Gershwin. In 1997 came New Jack Swing (Honest Entertainment), with big-band treatments of old standards and assorted pop/rock songs. 1998 saw the release of Jack Jones Paints a Tribute to Tony Bennett (Honest Entertainment), which was nominated for Grammy Awards for Best Traditional Pop Vocal Performance and Record of the Year.

In March 2008, Jones celebrated his 70th birthday and a half century in show business with a concert at the McCallum Theatre in Palm Desert, California. Guests included Patti Austin, Alan Bergman, and Marilyn Bergman. In 2010 he recorded an album focusing on the Bergmans' work called Love Makes the Changes. He also released an album featuring new recordings of some of his original hits, titled Love Ballad. In 2015 Jones released Seriously Frank: Celebrating the 100th Birthday of Frank Sinatra, with an orchestra arranged and conducted by Patrick Williams, with Dave Grusin on piano. The release was followed by a tour with dates in Los Angeles and the United Kingdom in 2016. Jones commenced his 80th Birthday Celebration Tour in 2018.

== Film, television, and theater ==
Jones made his film debut in Juke Box Rhythm (1959) playing Riff Manton, a young singer who is involved romantically with a princess (Jo Morrow). He sings three songs in the film. He acted in films such as The Comeback (1978), a gory British horror movie directed by Pete Walker along with the tele-film Condominium (1980), and Cruise of the Gods (2002). He had a humorous cameo in the film parody Airplane II: The Sequel (1982); as Robert Hays' character avoids searchlights while escaping captivity, the beams become a spotlight on Jones, performing a verse from his Love Boat TV theme song.

He became a staple on 1960s and 1970s variety shows performing on The Dinah Shore Chevy Show, The Ed Sullivan Show, The Andy Williams Show, The Dick Cavett Show, The Hollywood Palace, The Smothers Brothers Comedy Hour, The Carol Burnett Show, The Jerry Lewis Show, American Bandstand, This is Tom Jones, The Dean Martin Show, The Judy Garland Show, Playboy After Dark, The Jack Benny Program, The Steve Allen Show, and The Morecambe and Wise Show in the United Kingdom.

Jones twice hosted NBC's top-rated rock and roll music series Hullabaloo (1965-1966), and was featured in two prime-time specials, Jack Jones on the Move (1966) and The Jack Jones Special (1974). He appeared on the Password TV game show with Carol Lynley in 1964 and multiple times with Joan Fontaine in 1967. He provided the vocals to the theme song of Funny Face, "The Kind of Girl She Is". When the show returned renamed as The Sandy Duncan Show, he was replaced by an anonymous chorus. He also guest-starred in a cavalcade of television series of the era, such as The Rat Patrol, Police Woman, McMillan & Wife, The Hardy Boys/Nancy Drew Mysteries, $weepstake$; a game show, Match Game, and the sitcom Night Court.

Jones played himself in the episode "The Vegas Show" of It's a Living. He sang the opening theme for the television series The Love Boat (1977–1985), and appeared in a 1980 episode with his father Allan.

Jack Jones promoted the Chrysler New Yorker automobile in the mid-1970s with the "It's the Talk of the Town" ad campaign. On October 30, 1972, he appeared as a guest singer at the London Palladium in the United Kingdom in front of Queen Elizabeth The Queen Mother. Between 1973 and 1978, Jones hosted The Jack Jones Show, directed by Stanley Dorfman, produced and broadcast by the British Broadcasting Corporation's BBC-2 network. In 1990, Jones recorded "Three Coins in the Fountain", which was used in the remake version film Coins in the Fountain that year. He also appeared in the Chris Elliott television show Get a Life on the Fox television network. Beginning in the 21st century, Jones was active in musical theater, appearing in Guys and Dolls, South Pacific, and others. During that time he went on a national tour performing Don Quixote in the production Man of La Mancha.

In 2013, Jones appeared as himself as the nightclub singer in the film American Hustle. In 2014, he sang several of the songs, including the theme song, for the cable TV Cartoon Network miniseries Over the Garden Wall.

== Artistry ==
Jones was an anomaly in the 1960s pop scene, eschewing rock-and-roll trends and opting for a big band sound, romantic ballads, and the Great American Songbook style of music. However, sometimes he recorded something more pop, country, or bossa nova-oriented. For example, one of his biggest hits was "The Race Is On" by country musician George Jones (no relation). Gene Lees of Stereo Review commented that "he is the only singer I've heard who can take Sinatra material, sing for the meaning of the words as Sinatra does, and end up sounding not even remotely like Sinatra." Henry Pleasants of the same publication believed that "purely as a vocalist, [Jones] is in a class by himself."

== Personal life and death ==
Jones was married six times. In the second half of the 1960s, he had a well-publicized relationship with actress Jill St. John, and they were briefly married. Jones said demands on his singing career and the traveling involved contributed to the breakup. In the early 1970s, Jones married Gretchen Roberts. Later, he was linked romantically to Susan George. From 1977 to 1982, he was married to Kathy Simmons. From 1982 to 2005, he was married to British-born Kim Ely and they had a daughter, Nicole (born in 1991). Jones had another daughter, Crystal Thomas, from a former marriage to Lee Fuller. He lived with wife Eleonora in Indian Wells, southeast of Palm Springs, California.

Jones died from leukemia at Eisenhower Medical Center in Rancho Mirage, California, on October 23, 2024, at the age of 86.

== Discography ==
The lists below shows the singer's studio albums, compilation albums and hit songs only. His full discography, singles and other releases are described in a separate article. Jones placed 17 albums on the Billboard 200. In Joel Whitburn's ranking of top album-charting artists from 1955 to 1996, he was listed at No. 249.

=== Studio albums ===
- This Love of Mine (Capitol, 1959)
- Shall We Dance (Kapp, 1961)
- Lollipops and Roses (Kapp, 1961)
- Gift of Love (Kapp, 1962)
- I've Got a Lot of Livin' to Do! (Kapp, 1962)
- Call Me Irresponsible (Kapp, 1963)
- She Loves Me (Kapp, 1963)
- Wives and Lovers (Kapp, 1963)
- Bewitched (Kapp, 1964)
- In Love (Capitol, 1964)
- The Jack Jones Christmas Album (Kapp, 1964)
- Where Love Has Gone (Kapp, 1964)
- Dear Heart (Kapp, 1965)
- My Kind of Town (London, 1965)
- There's Love & There's Love & There's Love (Kapp, 1965)
- For the "In" Crowd (Kapp, 1965)
- Jack Jones Sings (Kapp, 1966)
- The Impossible Dream (Kapp, 1966)
- We'll Be Together Again (Sears, 1966)
- Our Song (Kapp, 1967)
- Lady (Kapp, 1967)
- Without Her (RCA Victor, 1967)
- Where Is Love? (RCA Victor, 1968)
- If You Ever Leave Me (RCA Victor, 1968)
- What the World Needs Now Is Love! (Kapp, 1968)
- Curtain Time (Kapp, 1968)
- L.A. Break Down (RCA Victor, 1968)
- A Jack Jones Christmas (RCA Victor, 1969)
- A Time for Us (RCA Victor 1969)
- Jack Jones Sings Michel Legrand (RCA Victor, 1971)
- Bread Winners (RCA Victor, 1972)
- A Song for You (RCA Victor, 1972)
- Together (RCA Victor, 1973)
- Christmas with Jack Jones (RCA Camden, 1973)
- Harbour (RCA Victor, 1974)
- What I Did for Love (RCA Victor, 1975)
- Write Me a Love Song, Charlie (RCA Victor, 1975)
- With One More Look at You (RCA Victor, 1977)
- The Full Life (RCA Victor, 1977)
- Nobody Does It Better (MGM, 1979)
- Don't Stop Now (MGM, 1980)
- I've Been Here All the Time (Polydor, 1980)
- Jack Jones (Applause, 1982)
- Fire & Rain (President, 1985)
- I Am a Singer (USA Music, 1984)
- The Gershwin Album (Columbia, 1992)
- Chase the Rainbows (Object 1992)
- The Mood Is Love (Quicksilver, 1993)
- New Jack Swing (Linn, 1997)
- White Christmas (MCA, 1998)
- Jack Jones Paints a Tribute to Tony Bennett (Honest, 1998)
- The Wind Beneath My Wings (Castle Pulse, 2002)
- I Never Had It So Good (Country House, 2009)
- Love Makes the Changes – The Lyrics of Alan and Marilyn Bergman (Aspen Records, 2010)
- Love Ballad featuring Jack Jones Greatest Hits 2.0 (Aspen Records, 2010)
- American Hustle (Sony Legacy, 2010)
- Seriously Frank - Celebrating the 100th Birthday of Frank Sinatra (Aspen Records, 2015)
- Every Other Day I Have the Blues (Cavalry Productions, 2021)
- ArtWork with Joey DeFrancesco (Cavalry Productions, 2023)

=== Hit songs ===
Year	Single	Chart positions		
Year	Single	US	CB	US AC
1962	"Lollipops and Roses"	66	42	6
1962	"Gift of Love"	-	108	-
1962	"Poetry"	-	110	-
1963	"Call Me Irresponsible"	75	62	-
1963	"Wives and Lovers"	14	12	9
1963	"Toys in the Attic"	92	115	-
1964	"Love with the Proper Stranger"	62	59	17
1964	"The First Night of the Full Moon"	59	62	12
1964	"Where Love Has Gone"	62	69	12
1964	"Dear Heart"	30	15	6
1965	"The Race Is On"	15	12	1
1965	"Seein' the Right Love Go Wrong"	46	41	9
1965	"Travellin' On"	132	-	-
1965	"Just Yesterday"	73	83	5
1965	"The True Picture"	134	109	27
1965	"Love Bug"	71	56	5
1966	"The Weekend"	123	100	20
1966	"The Impossible Dream (The Quest)"	35	32	1
1966	"A Day in the Life of a Fool"	62	55	4
1967	"Lady"	39	34	1
1967	"I'm Indestructible"	81	84	-
1967	"Afterthoughts"	-	-	19
1967	"Now I Know"	73	74	3
1967	"Our Song"	92	76	13
1967	"Open for Business as Usual"	130	104	26
1967	"Live for Life"	99	-	9
1967	"Oh How Much I Love You"	-	129	-
1968	"If You Ever Leave Me"	92	-	5
1968	"The Gypsies, the Jugglers and the Clowns"	-	134	-
1968	"Follow Me"	117	-	20
1968	"I Really Want to Know You"	-	-	15
1968	"The Way That I Live"	-	-	33
1968	"L.A. Break Down (and Take Me In)"	106	-	21
1970	"Sweet Changes"	-	-	24
1970	"I Didn't Count on Love"	-	-	38
1971	"Let Me Be the One"	-	-	18
1974	"She Doesn't Live Here Anymore"	-	-	45
1975	"What I Did for Love"	-	-	25
1977	"With One More Look at You"	-	-	21
1980	"Love Boat Theme"	-	-	37

== Awards and nominations ==
Year	Award	Category	Nominated work	Result	Ref.
1968	Awit Awards	Male Recording Artist of the Year (Foreign Division)	—N/a	Won	
1961	Grammy Awards	Best Solo Vocal Performance, Male	"Lollipops and Roses"	Won	
1963	Grammy Awards	Record of the Year	"Wives and Lovers"	Nominated	
1963	Grammy Awards	Best Vocal Performance, Male	"Wives and Lovers"	Won	
1966	Grammy Awards	Best Vocal Performance, Male	"The Impossible Dream"	Nominated	
1998	Grammy Awards	Best Traditional Pop Vocal Performance	Jack Jones Paints a Tribute to Tony Bennett	Nominated	

=== Honors ===
- In 1989, Jones received a star on the Hollywood Walk of Fame.
- In 2003, a Golden Palm Star on the Palm Springs, California, Walk of Stars was dedicated to Jones.
