= Dear Heart and Other Great Songs of Love =

Studio album by Jack Jones
- Released: December 1964
- Recorded: Late 1964
- Genres: Traditional pop; Easy listening
- Length: 32 minutes 27 seconds
- Labels: Kapp Records (KL 1415; KS 3415)
- Producer: Michael Kapp

Jack Jones chronology
The Jack Jones Christmas Album (1964)	Dear Heart and Other Great Songs of Love (1964)	My Kind of Town (1965)

Singles from Dear Heart and Other Great Songs of Love
- 1. "Dear Heart" Released: November 1964

Professional ratings
Review scores
Source	Rating
AllMusic	3/5 stars
The Encyclopedia of Popular Music	4/5 stars

Dear Heart and Other Great Songs of Love, also known as Songs of Love in the UK, is a studio album by American singer Jack Jones released in late 1964 by Kapp Records.

== Background and content ==
Dear Heart and Other Great Songs of Love was the final of four albums that Jones released in 1964, following the title track's success. Although released at the height of the British Invasion, the LP was an immediate commercial hit. It proved Jones' appeal and the lasting popularity of traditional pop, even while pop-rock British acts were dominating the charts and airplay. The album contained contained slow but warm cover versions of multiple standards like "I'm Glad There Is You", I'll Get By (As Long as I Have You), and "Love Is Here to Stay". It was released right before the start of 1965 by Kapp Records, and was available both in mono and stereo.

== Reception ==
The album received a mostly positive reception upon its release. Billboard stated that "The performances are warm and extremely listenable". Cashbox believed Jones's "slick readings of such favorites as 'I'll Get By,' 'Love Is Here To Stay,' and 'Thank Heaven For Little Girls' is sure to send the set to hitsville in short order." Record World highlighted it as "Album of the Week" and stated that the "young crooner gets better all the time as his recent reviews at New York's Persian Room attest loudly." They noted that the "new package is tagged after Jack's snappy version of 'Dear Heart'". On the other hand, The Toronto Star said that "Jones has a fine voice, but lacks heart", noting that "the songs from shows and films sound almost identical".

Retrospectives were also positive. William Ruhlmann of AllMusic said that "The arrangements were sympathetic, and Jones gave the songs his usual warm, well-articulated interpretations." The Encyclopedia of Popular Music gave the album a four-star rating as well.

== Chart performance ==
The album debuted on Billboard magazine's Top LP's chart in the issue dated January 9, 1965, peaking at No. 11 during a twenty-five-week run on the chart. It debuted on Cashbox magazine's Top 100 Albums chart in the issue also dated January 9, 1965, peaking at No. 12 during an eighteen-week run on the chart. The album debuted on Record World magazine's 100 Top LP's chart in the issue dated January 16, 1965, peaking at No. 7 during a nineteen-week run on the chart.

The album's title track debuted on the Billboard Hot 100 in the issue dated November 28, 1964, peaking at number 30 during a 11-week run, and debuted on the magazine's Easy Listening chart November 28, peaking at number six during a 11-week run. The track debuted on the Cashbox singles chart in the issue dated November 28, 1964, peaking at number 15 during an 12-week run.

== Track listing ==
Side One
No.	Title	Writer(s)	Length
1.	"Dear Heart"	Ray Evans; Jay Livingston; Henry Mancini	2:36
2.	"You're Sensational"	Cole Porter	2:26
3.	"Love Is Here to Stay"	George Gershwin; Ira Gershwin	2:24
4.	"I'll Get By (As Long as I Have You)"	Fred E. Ahlert; Roy Turk	2:53
5.	"You'd Better Love Me"	John Baker Gray; Hugh Martin	2:01
6.	"All the Things You Are"	Oscar Hammerstein II; Jerome Kern	3:02

Side Two
No.	Title	Writer(s)	Length
7.	"Emily"	Henry Mancini; Johnny Mercer	3:13
8.	"Thank Heaven for Little Girls"	Alan Jay Lerner; Frederick Loewe	2:20
9.	"I'm Glad There Is You"	Jimmy Dorsey; Paul Mertz	3:00
10.	"When She Makes Music"	Marvin Fisher; Jack Segal	3:17
11.	"Something's Gotta Give"	Johnny Mercer	2:19
12.	"You're My Girl"	Sammy Cahn; Jule Styne	2:56
Total length:			32:27

== Production and personnel ==
Recorded in late 1964. Produced by Michael Kapp. Arrangers/conductors include: Don Costa, Jack Elliott, and Harry Betts.

== Charts ==
=== Album ===
Chart (1965)	Peak position
US Billboard Top LP's	11
US Cashbox Top 100 Albums	12
US Record World 100 Top LP's	7

=== Singles ===
Single	Year	Chart	Peak position
"Dear Heart"	1964	US Billboard Hot 100	30
"Dear Heart"	1964	US Cashbox Top 100 Singles	15
"Dear Heart"	1964	US Easy Listening	6
"Dear Heart"	1964	CAN RPM Adult Contemporary	9
