= The Weekend (Jack Jones song) =

1966 pop song

Single by Jack Jones

from the album For the "In" Crowd
- B-side: "Wildflower"
- Released: January 1966
- Recorded: December 1965
- Genre: Pop
- Length: 2:05
- Label: Kapp; K-736
- Songwriters: Teddy Randazzo; Lou Stallman; Bob Weinstein
- Producer: Michael Kapp

Jack Jones singles chronology
"Love Bug" (1965)	"The Weekend" (1966)	"The Impossible Dream (The Quest)" (1966)

Professional ratings
Review scores
Source	Rating
Record World	4/5 stars
Cashbox	Positive (Pick of the Week)
Billboard	Positive (Spotlight)

"The Weekend" is a song written by Teddy Randazzo, Lou Stallman, and Bob Weinstein. It was most notably performed by Jack Jones, whose version was released as a single in early 1966 by Kapp Records.

== Background and content ==
The song was written by Teddy Randazzo, Lou Stallman, and Bob Weinstein with performance rights handled by BMI. The promotion of it and the two main recorded versions was under disk promoter Herb Rosen who represented South Mountain Music. It was reportedly his first project for them. The song is short and is relatively fast-moving with a swinging arrangement. The lyrics focus on a hard-working man who really looks forward to the days Saturday and Sunday (the weekend), so he can spend some time with his girlfriend.

== Jack Jones version ==
=== Release and reception ===
"The Weekend" was released as a seven-inch single in January 1966 by Kapp Records in the United States and other territories. In Australia the catalogue number was K-4073. It was backed by another pop-romancer, "Wildflower" on the B-side. Both tracks were lifted from his For the "In" Crowd album released concurrently and were arranged and conducted by Don Costa. The single was produced by Michael Kapp himself, and also didn't receive a picture sleeve. Jones' version of "The Weekend" was marketed as the original as well.

The single received a positive critical reception upon its release. Record World gave the single four stars and in its short review of it stated that "Jazzy waltz-foxtrot song gets an extremely pleasant rendition from the Jones boy." Cashbox reviewed the single in late January and said that Jones "should have no difiiculty in repeating his recent 'Love Bug' triumph with either side of this ultra-commercial Kapp release." Continuing, "One side, 'The Weekend,' a cover of the previously released Steve Lawrence Columbia outing, is a rhythmic, chorus-backed handclapper. ...The other side, 'Wildflower,' is a pretty, hauntingly melodic bittersweet romancer." Billboard magazine stated that "Jones has one of his most commercial entries in this off-beat rhythm number loaded with sales appeal." They noted that it "Fits all types of programming."

=== Chart performance ===
"The Weekend" debuted at No. 23 on February 5, 1966, on the Billboard Bubbling Under the Hot 100, dropping out after a two-week run on the chart. The single reached No. 100 on the Cashbox Top 100 Singles, and peaked at No. 9 on the Record World Looking Ahead singles chart, during its six-week run on the chart. The single also peaked at No. 20 on the Billboard Easy Listening chart. Outside of America "The Weekend" didn't sell well, unlike "Love Bug" the single didn't chart in Canada.

=== Track listing ===
7" vinyl single

No.	Title	Lyrics	Length
1.	"The Weekend"	Teddy Randazzo, Lou Stallman, and Bob Weinstein	2:05
2.	"Wildflower"	Estelle Levitt, Ruth Sexton	2:20

== Steve Lawrence version ==
"The Week-End"
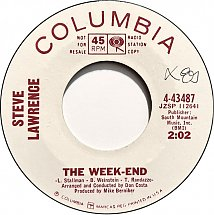

Single by Steve Lawrence
- B-side: "Only the Young"
- Released: January 3, 1966
- Recorded: December 1965
- Genre: Pop
- Length: 2:02
- Label: Columbia; 4-43487
- Songwriters: Teddy Randazzo; Lou Stallman; Bob Weinstein
- Producer: Mike Berniker

Steve Lawrence singles chronology
"Millions of Roses" (1965)	"The Week-End" (1966)	"The Ballad of the Sad Young Men" (1966)

=== Release and reception ===
The competing version of "The Weekend", titled "The Week-End" by Steve Lawrence was released as a seven-inch single on January 3, 1966, by Columbia Records in the United States and other territories. It was also arranged by Don Costa, but was produced by Mike Berniker. It was backed by "Only the Young" on the B-side. Unlike Jones' version, Lawrence's version wasn't included in any of his albums.

The single received a positive reception as well. Record World rated it four stars and called it a "Syncopated tune that changes pace nicely and provides Steve with one of his best outings." Cashbox magazine stated that "Lawrence can quickly get back in his previous money-making ways with this Top 40-oriented Columbia outing dubbed “The Week-End." The magazine described it as a "rhythmic infectious ditty". The Oregon Daily Journal referred to it as "a real swinger".

=== Chart performance ===
Although released before Jones' version, Lawrence's "The Week-End" debuted a few weeks later on the Billboard Bubbling Under the Hot 100 chart, at No. 31 on February 19, 1966. It dropped out the following week. His version debuted on the Billboard Easy Listening chart on February 5, 1966, peaking at No. 24 during a seven-week run on it. On the Cashbox Looking Ahead charts both songs charted concurrently, reaching No. 17.

=== Track listing ===
7" vinyl single

No.	Title	Lyrics	Length
1.	"The Week-End"	Teddy Randazzo, Lou Stallman, and Bob Weinstein	2:02
2.	"Only the Young"	Ahlert, Fisher	3:28

== Charts ==
Chart performance for "The Weekend" by Jones
Chart (1966)	Peak position
US Billboard Bubbling Under Hot 100	123
US Cashbox Top 100 Singles	100
US Record World Up-Coming Singles	109
US Billboard Easy Listening	20

Chart performance for "The Week-End" by Lawrence
Chart (1966)	Peak position
US Billboard Bubbling Under Hot 100	131
US Cashbox Looking Ahead	117
US Billboard Easy Listening	24
