= The Impossible Dream (Jack Jones album) =

Studio album by Jack Jones
- Released: June 1966
- Genres: Traditional pop; Vocal pop
- Length: 28:24
- Labels: Kapp; KL-1486/KS-3486

Jack Jones chronology
For the "In" Crowd (1966)	The Impossible Dream (1966)	Jack Jones Sings (1966)

Singles from The Impossible Dream
- 1. "The Impossible Dream (The Quest)" Released: April 1966

The Impossible Dream is the twenty-first studio album by American singer Jack Jones, released in 1966 by Kapp Records. The album followed the success of the namesake single, which topped the easy listening charts in early 1966. The Impossible Dream became his best-charting US release and received a positive contemporary critical reception as well.

== Background and content ==
In early 1966, Jones had immense commercial success with a ballad cover of the song "The Impossible Dream (The Quest)", which reached No. 35 on the Billboard Hot 100, No. 32 on Cashbox Top 100 Singles, and No. 1 on the Easy Listening chart. It became one of his most recognizable songs. Kapp Records then sent him to the studio to record a full album, titled after the hit single. It was released in June 1966 and was made up entirely of cover songs. It was available both in stereo and monaural sound. While most tracks were popular contemporary songs, three tracks ("You Better Go Now", "All or Nothing at All", and "This Is All I Ask") were standards.

== Critical reception ==
Professional ratings
Review scores
Source	Rating
The Encyclopedia of Popular Music	4/5 stars
AllMusic	3/5 stars

The album received a positive critical reception upon its release. Billboard believed that "This is Jones' most commercial and artistic effort, spotlighting his hit The Impossible Dream (The Quest)," the magazine also noted that Jones excels with his "sensitive reading" of 'The Shadow of Your Smile'. Adding that "...his fresh new swing version of 'You Better Go Now' and his wild jazz-flavored treatment of 'What Now My Love,' 'Strangers In The Night,' and 'My Best Girl' from Mame are "standouts". Record World believed that it was his "best" album since he started recording.

Cashbox magazine stated that "The melodious tones of Jack Jones should make this set, that is titled after and contains the chanter’s current chart climber “The Impossible Dream,” a major sales item", adding that "... with the total result being a session jammed packed with easy to listen to and enjoy sounds". It was given a four-star rating by The Encyclopedia of Popular Music as well. The rating meant that it was a "high standard album" from Jones and "therefore highly recommended"

== Chart performance ==
The Impossible Dream reached the main US record charts, though its presence on them varied. The album debuted on the Billboard Top LP's chart on July 16, 1966, and peaked at number 9. It stayed on the chart for a total of sixty-six weeks and is his highest-charting album in the US. It entered Cashbox Top 100 Albums chart in the issue dated July 16, 1966, remaining on the chart for 22 weeks and peaking at number 23. The Impossible Dream debuted on the Record World 100 Top LP's chart in the issue dated July 9, 1966, peaking at number 13 during a 26-week run on it.

== Track listing ==
Side one
No.	Title	Writer(s)	Length
1.	"The Impossible Dream (The Quest)"	Joe Darion, Mitch Leigh	2:19
2.	"The Shadow of Your Smile"	Johnny Mandel, Paul Francis Webster	2:31
3.	"I Will Wait for You"	Michel Legrand, Norman Gimbel	2:28
4.	"Then Was Then and Now Is Now"	Cy Coleman, Peggy Lee	2:43
5.	"All or Nothing at All"	Jack Lawrence, Arthur Altman	2:52
6.	"Feeling Good"	Anthony Newley, Leslie Bricusse	3:07

Side two
No.	Title	Writer(s)	Length
7.	"Alfie"	Burt Bacharach, Hal David	2:33
8.	"Strangers in the Night"	Bert Kaempfert, Charles Singleton, Eddie Snyder	2:26
9.	"What Now My Love"	Gilbert Bécaud, Carl Sigman	2:30
10.	"This Is All I Ask"	Gordon Jenkins	3:21
11.	"My Best Girl"	Jerry Herman	2:22
12.	"You Better Go Now"	Irvin Graham, Bickley Reichner	2:27
Total length:			31:46

== Charts ==
Chart peaks for The Impossible Dream
Chart (1966)	Peak position
US Top LPs (Billboard)	9
US Cashbox Top 100 Albums	23
US Record World 100 Top LP's	13
