= My Kind of Town (album) =

Studio album by Jack Jones
- Released: April 1965
- Recorded: Early 1965
- Genres: Early Pop; Easy Listening; Vocal
- Length: 33 minutes 26 seconds
- Labels: Kapp Records (KL 1433, KS 3433)
- Producer: Michael Kapp

Jack Jones chronology
Dear Heart and Other Great Songs of Love (1965)	My Kind of Town (1965)	There's Love & There's Love & There's Love (1965)

Singles from My Kind of Town
- 1. "The Race Is On" Released: February 1965

My Kind of Town is a studio album by American singer Jack Jones released in early 1965 by Kapp Records in the US, and by London Records in the UK. The album reached the US top-40 on national charts published by Billboard, Cashbox, and Record World. My Kind of Town also received a highly positive critical reception.

== Background, recording, and content ==
My Kind of Town was the second of five albums that Jones released in 1965, with it being shortly released after his hit single "The Race Is On", which topped the Billboard Easy Listening chart. The album was produced by Michael Kapp himself, with arrangements provided by Marty Paich, Don Costa and Glenn Osser. The album featured a mix of new and old, original and covers of songs. "King of the Road" (by Roger Miller), "My Kind of Town" (by Frank Sinatra), and "More (by Kai Winding), were all recent pop hits Jones covered, while "Somewhere Along the Way", "The One I Love", and "Time After Time" were all jazz standards. The rest of the songs were originals.

== Chart performance ==
The album debuted on Billboard magazine's Top LP's chart in the issue dated May 8, 1965, peaking at No. 29 during a twenty-two-week run on the chart. It debuted on Cashbox magazine's Top 100 Albums chart in the issue also dated May 8, 1965, peaking at No. 31 during a seventeen-week run on the chart. The album entered the Record World magazine's 100 Top LP's chart in the issue dated May 15, 1965, peaking at No. 24 during a nineteen-week run on the chart.

== Critical reception ==
=== Contemporary reviews ===
My Kind of Town received several positive reviews upon its rleease. Record World picked it as album of the week and said that "Jones has established himself in the top rank, and this package will cement him in that lofty position," noting that "He ranges all far and wide for material and does it impeccably". They publication called the "Buyers' kind of album." Cashbox said that "The enthralling vocal and stylistic talents of Jack Jones are wonderfully highlighted in his newest Kapp effort," believing "The excellent quality of this set, the top notch selections and sales appeal of Jones should turn the LP into a smash." Billboard stated that it was "the best programmed and performed LP of his career," saying Jones' individual style is "made vividly clear in his reading the clever lyrics of the title tune."

=== Retrospectives ===
Professional ratings
Review scores
Source	Rating
AllMusic	3.5/5 stars
The Encyclopedia of Popular Music	3/5 stars

The retrospective review by Jason Ankeny of the album on AllMusic stated, "My Kind of Town hangs together as a cohesive listening experience", continuing that "The rotating arrangers emphasize Jones' range and scope – by turns ebullient and melancholy, the songs are rendered with absolute purity of expression." The Encyclopedia of Popular Music gave it a three-star rating, which meant that they believed the album was "good".

== Track listing ==
Side One
No.	Title	Writer(s)	Length
1.	"My Kind of Town"	Sammy Cahn; Jimmy Van Heusen	2:56
2.	"Somewhere Along the Way"	Kurt Adams; Sammy Gallop	3:32
3.	"More"	Norman Newell; Gaetano Oliviero; Riz Ortolani	3:26
4.	"The Race Is On"	Don Rollins	1:47
5.	"I Can't Believe I'm Losing You"	Domenico Costa; Don Costa; Philip Zeller	2:42
6.	"Travellin' On"	Larry Fotine	3:21

Side Two
No.	Title	Writer(s)	Length
7.	"The One I Love"	Isham Jones; Gus Kahn	2:42
8.	"Yes, I Can"	Lee Adams; Charles Strouse	2:51
9.	"I'm All Smiles"	Michael Leonard; Herbert Martin	2:27
10.	"I Must Know"	Neal Hefti; Lil Mattis; Lillian Mattis	2:07
11.	"Time After Time"	Sammy Cahn; Jule Styne	3:03
12.	"King of the Road"	Roger Miller	2:32
Total length:			33:26

== Charts ==
=== Album ===
Chart (1965)	Peak position
US Billboard Top LPs	29
US Cashbox Top 100 Albums	31
US Record World 100 Top LP's	24

=== Singles ===
Single	Year	Chart	Peak position
"The Race Is On"	1965	US Billboard Hot 100	15
"The Race Is On"	1965	US Easy Listening	1
"The Race Is On"	1965	US Cashbox	12
"The Race Is On"	1965	CAN RPM Top Singles	12
"The Race Is On"	1965	CAN Adult Contemporary	8
"Travellin' On"	1965	US Billboard Bubbling Under	132

== Personnel ==
All credits are adapted from the liner notes of My Kind of Town.

- Jack Jones – lead vocals
- Glenn Osser – arranger, conductor (A2, B5)
- Don Costa – arranger, conductor (A4, A5, B4)
- Marty Paich – arranger, conductor (A6, B1–B3, B6)
- Colin Romoff – adaptation (A6)

== Production ==
All credits are adapted from the liner notes of My Kind of Town.

- Michael Kapp – producer
- Kapp Records Inc. (US) – manufacturer
- The Decca Record Company Limited (UK) – manufacturer
- Cloud & Baker (UK) – printing
- Don Bronstein – photography
- Mike Gross – sleeve notes
