= Bewitched (Jack Jones album) =

Studio album by Jack Jones
- Released: Early 1964
- Recorded: 1964
- Genre: Early Pop; Easy Listening; Vocal Jazz
- Length: 35 minutes 19 seconds
- Label: Kapp Records (KL 1365, KS 3365)
- Producer: Michael Kapp

Jack Jones chronology
| Wives and Lovers (1963) | Bewitched (1964) | Where Love Has Gone (1964) |

Bewitched is a studio album by American singer Jack Jones released in early 1964 on Kapp Records. It contained 12 trakcs, including the lead single "Love with the Proper Stranger", which hit the US Easy Listening top-20 and pop top-75. The album reached the top-50 on the US album charts and received a positive critical reception.

== Background ==
Jones, who just had his most successful single in 1963, "Wives and Lovers", and was voted the most promising male vocalist by American disc jockeys in Billboard's 16th annual record artist popularity poll and Cashbox's in 1962 and again in 1963, chose to record another album filled with standards and new hits, mainly film and musical songs.

== Overview ==
Bewitched was the second of four albums that Jones released in 1964, with it being shortly released after his hit single "Love with the Proper Stranger", (title song from the movie starring Natalie Wood) which reached No. 17 on the Billboard Easy Listening chart. The album was produced by Michael Kapp himself and arranged and conducted by Jack Elliot, Pete King and Shorty Rogers. The album featured covers of older show tunes like the title song, "Bewitched", recent songs from musicals like "Don't Rain on My Parade", (Funny Girl and "From Russa with Love" (same-name musical), and some of his own songs. "The Mood I'm In" formed the B-side to his single "Love with the Proper Stranger" and later in 1967 to his single "Open for Business as Usual".

== Chart performance ==
Cashbox also said to "Watch this one zoom to the upper chart area", and to the upper chart areas it did go; the album debuted on Billboard magazine's Top LP's chart in the issue dated June 20, 1964, peaking at No. 43 during a nineteen-week run on the chart. It debuted on Cashbox magazine's albums chart in the issue dated June 14, 1964, peaking at No. 19 on the Top 50 Stereo Albums chart during an eleven-week run on it. The album reached No. 22 on the magazine's Top 100 Albums (Monoraul) chart during a longer sixteen-week run on it.

== Reception ==
Professional ratings
Review scores
| Source | Rating |
|---|---|
| AllMusic | 3/5 stars |
| The Encyclopedia of Popular Music | 3/5 stars |
| Billboard | Positive, "Spotlight" pick |
| Cashbox | Positive, Pop pick |
| Record World | Positive |

Billboard reviewed the album saying "...His boyish charm and clean-cut appearance enraptures the gals. Jack has also associated himself with winning new tunes - one of which, 'Love A Proper Stranger' is featured here. Other selections include 'Bewitched', 'I'm Old Fashioned', and 'It Only Takes a Moment' (from "Hello, Dolly")."

Cashbox magazine wrote "The songster, just voted 1963's best vocalist, wraps up a dozen melodic gems in his distinctive vocal manner. Jones fans will dig his readings of 'Bewitched,' 'Love With A Proper Stranger' and a haunting newie in the 'Ebb Tide' tradition tabbed, 'Far Away.'"

Record World said "Grammy winning Jack presents a delectable spell-caster with variety the key word. The flexible Jack-here working frequently with a jazz undercurrent-is able not only to freshen up the oft-done title tune but to do a Streisand fave ('Don't Rain on My Parade') definitively, as well as an Allan Joneser, 'Rosalie'".

== Track listing ==
=== Side one ===
| No. | Title | Writer(s) | Length |
|---|---|---|---|
| 1. | "Love with the Proper Stranger" | Elmer Bernstein / Johnny Mercer | 2:22 |
| 2. | "The Mood I'm In" | Jimmy McHugh / Dorothy Fields | 2:39 |
| 3. | "Bewitched" | Richard Rodgers / Lorenz Hart | 4:04 |
| 4. | "Right as the Rain" | Harold Arlen / E. Y. Harburg | 2:47 |
| 5. | "Luck Be a Lady" | Frank Loesser | 2:29 |
| 6. | "Far Away" | Oscar Hammerstein II / Sigmund Romberg | 2:40 |

=== Side two ===
| No. | Title | Writer(s) | Length |
|---|---|---|---|
| 7. | "It Only Takes a Moment" | Jerry Herman | 2:10 |
| 8. | "I've Grown Accustomed to Her Face" | Frederick Loewe / Alan Jay Lerner | 3:29 |
| 9. | "I'm Old Fashioned" | Jerome Kern / Johnny Mercer | 3:12 |
| 10. | "Don't Rain on My Parade" | Jule Styne / Bob Merrill | 2:12 |
| 11. | "From Russia with Love" | Lionel Bart | 2:20 |
| 12. | "Rosalie" | Cole Porter | 1:45 |
| Total length: | | | 35:19 |

== Charts ==
Picture of Jones, used for the cover of Cashbox magazine on April 18, 1964

=== Album ===
| Chart (1964) | Peak position |
|---|---|
| US Billboard Top LPs | 43 |
| US Cashbox Top 50 Stereo | 19 |
| US Cashbox Top 100 Albums | 22 |
| US Record World 100 Top LP's | 22 |

=== Singles ===
| Single | Year | Chart | Peak position |
|---|---|---|---|
| "Love with the Proper Stranger" | 1964 | US Billboard Hot 100 | 62 |
| "Love with the Proper Stranger" | 1964 | US Easy Listening | 17 |
| "Love with the Proper Stranger" | 1964 | US Cashbox | 59 |
