= Our Song (album) =

Studio album by Jack Jones
- Released: September 1967
- Recorded: 1965; 1966; 1967
- Genre: Vocal pop; easy listening
- Length: 32:30
- Label: Kapp; KL 1531; KS 3531

Jack Jones chronology
Lady (1967)	Our Song (1967)	Without Her (1967)

Singles from Our Song
- 1. "Now I Know" Released: May 1967; 2. "Our Song" Released: August 1967; 3. "Oh How Much I Love You" Released: December 1967

Professional ratings
Review scores
Source	Rating
The Encyclopedia of Popular Music	3/5 stars
Cashbox	Positive, "Pop Pick"
Record World	Positive, "Album of the Week"

Our Song is an album by American singer Jack Jones, released in 1967 in the US by Kapp Records and in 1968 in the UK by London Records. It was his final studio album for both record labels. The album received a positive critical reception and reached the charts in October 1967.

== Background and content ==
The album was recorded and released after two successful singles, "Now I Know" and the later released "Our Song", which the album was a namesake of. The album includes the McCartney-penned Beatles song, "Michelle," and a few songs from the 1967 film Doctor Dolittle, but otherwise avoids cover songs. Our Song also included a flip to his 1965 single "Just Yesterday", "The True Picture", which had charted alongside it, but didn't see any immediate album inclusions.

== Reception ==
The album received a positive critical reception upon its release. Cashbox magazine said that Jones "interprets twelve pop ditties in a warm, romantic style", adding that he "performs with vibrant intensity," and noting that "...the set should score solidly with the chanter’s fans." Record World magazine put the album in its "Albums of the Week" section, writing that a couple of songs from "Doctor Dolittle" and other "good things" "enliven" the new album. The Anaheim Bulletin described Jones' voice as "Rich baritone with cello-warmth". The album was given a three-star rating by The Encyclopedia of Popular Music as well.

== Release and chart performance ==
Our Song was released by Kapp Records in September 1967 as a vinyl LP and was available both in stereo and mono. In the United Kingdom the album was released in early 1968 by London Records. In early 1969, it was also issued as an 8-track cartridge by the Kapp label. Decades later, the album was re-released on Geffen Records to digital and streaming sites.

The album debuted on the Billboard Top LPs chart in October 1967, peaking at No. 148 and remaining on the chart for seven weeks. In Cashbox the album would break into the Top 100 Albums, reaching No. 71 during a nine-week run on the chart. The album debuted on the Record World 100 Top LP's chart in October too, but was ranked higher at No. 66.

=== Singles ===
"Now I Know" was a single by Jack Jones, released in May 1967. His version peaked at No. 73 on the Billboard Hot 100, and at No. 3 on the Easy Listening chart. "Our Song" reached No. 92 on the Billboard Hot 100, No. 76 on Cashbox's singles chart. It was ranked higher at No. 13 on the Billboard Easy Listening chart. Cashbox said that Jones did an "Excellent reading of a wonderfully constructed tune." "The True Picture" originally bubbled under the pop charts in 1965.

== Track listing ==
Side one
No.	Title	Writer(s)	Length
1.	"Our Song"	Umberto Bindi; Franco Califano; Nicola Salerno; Anthony Ralph Clarke	02:47
2.	"Michelle"	John Lennon; Paul McCartney	03:46
3.	"After Today"	Leslie Bricusse; Bob Merrill; Jule Styne	01:54
4.	"Don't Give Your Love Away"	Bass; Maury Laws	02:40
5.	"More and More"	Tommy Karen; Allan Reuss; Rainey Robinson	02:12
6.	"When I Look in Your Eyes"	Leslie Bricusse	02:33

Side two
No.	Title	Writer(s)	Length
7.	"Now I Know"	James Last; Stanley Jay Gelber; Scott English	02:50
8.	"Oh How Much I Love You"	Domenico Modugno; Lee Pockriss; Paul Vance	03:40
9.	"As Time Goes By"	Herman Hupfeld	02:25
10.	"The True Picture"	Edward Heyman; Sidney Lippman	02:54
11.	"'Cause I Got So Much Lovin' in Me"	Pearl Bender; Gloria Shayne	02:28
12.	"Along the Way"	Leslie Bricusse; Bob Merrill; Jule Styne	02:06
Total length:			32:30

== Charts ==
Chart performance for Our Song
Chart (1967)	Peak position
US Top LPs (Billboard)	148
US Cashbox Top 100 Albums	71
US Record World 100 Top LP's	66

== Release history ==
Release history and formats for Our Song
Region	Date	Format	Label	Ref.
North America	September 1967	Vinyl (LP)	Kapp	
United Kingdom	January 1968	Vinyl (LP)	London	
United States	January 1969	8-track cartridge	Kapp	
Worldwide	Circa 2020	Digital; streaming	Geffen	
