= There's Love & There's Love & There's Love =

Studio album by Jack Jones
- Released: August 1965
- Recorded: Mid 1965
- Studio: In New York City
- Genres: Vocal pop; Traditional pop
- Length: 36 minutes 26 seconds
- Labels: Kapp Records (KL 1535; KS 3535)
- Producer: Michael Kapp

Jack Jones chronology
My Kind of Town (1965)	There's Love & There's Love & There's Love (1965)	For the "In" Crowd (1966)

Singles from There's Love & There's Love & There's Love
- 1. "And I Love Her" Released: November 1965

There's Love & There's Love & There's Love is the fifteenth studio album by American pop vocalist Jack Jones, released in August 1965 by Kapp Records. The project included a mixture of old and newer standards. The album reached high positions on the US album charts and received a positive reception.

== Background and release ==
Jack Jones was a popular easy listening and pop singer in the 1960s, recording with Kapp Records and gaining several hits. Concurrent with the album's release, he scored another Billboard Easy Listening chart hit titled "Just Yesterday". However, it wasn't from the album and was in a general pop style. The recordings for There's Love & There's Love & There's Love were taken from sessions held in mid 1965 in New York City. The songs were arranged and conducted by Nelson Riddle. There's Love & There's Love & There's was originally released in early August 1965 on the Kapp label. It was the fifteenth, the second of the year, studio collection released in Jones' career. The album was distributed as a vinyl LP, containing six songs on side one and six on side two of the record. Decades later, the album was re-released on Geffen Records to digital and streaming sites.

== Reception ==
Professional ratings
Review scores
Source	Rating
AllMusic	4/5 stars
The Encyclopedia of Popular Music	3/5 stars
Billboard	Positive (Spotlight Pick)
Record World	Positive (Hit Pick)

=== Contemporary reviews ===
The album received a positive critical reception upon its release. Billboard magazine believed that "The Jones approach and warm delivery of material, such as 'The Night Is Young,' is all taste, class and vocal perfection." They noted that "Evergreens like 'Embraceable You' and 'While We’re Young' take on new freshness," stating that "This initial teaming of Jones with arranger Riddle assures great sales appeal." Record World stated that "Jones dispenses advice and sentiment on the songwriter's favorite subject — love. The publication noted that " And the tunesmiths represented here are only the best. Jack's easy baritone shines throughout." The Turlock Journal described the album as "another winner" for Jones.

=== Retrospective reviews ===
Retrospectives were positive as well. Jason Ankeny on AllMusic stated that the album "teams Jack Jones with the immortal arranger Nelson Riddle for a dizzyingly romantic collection of ballads as light and gentle as a summer rain." He believed that "With their perfectly placed French horns, trombones, and flutes, Riddle's arrangements eloquently complement the cut-marble sophistication of Jones' vocals." He concluded that "Both collaborators are masters of understatement, and their emphasis on subtlety and atmosphere illuminates well-chosen material like 'Young at Heart,' 'A Lovely Way to Spend an Evening,' and 'And I Love Her'." American writer Will Friedwald in his book said the LP is a collection of "mostly classic ballads, blessed with an especially winning title song by Cahn and Van Heusen. There's Love opens with a modern, down-to-earth treatment of Dana Suesse's operettaish melody 'The Night Is Young and You're So Beautiful.'"

== Chart performance ==
The album debuted on Billboard magazine's Top LP's chart in the issue dated September 18, 1965, peaking at No. 86 during a thirteen-week run on the chart. It entered Cashbox magazine's Top 100 Albums chart in the issue also dated September 4, 1965, peaking at No. 71 during a seven-week run on the chart. The album debuted on Record World magazine's 100 Top LP's chart in the issue dated also September 4, 1965, peaking at No. 51. There's Love & There's Love & There's Love stayed on the chart through the September and October and dropped out before the end of fall, with a total nine-week run on it.

== Track listings ==
=== Vinyl version ===
Side one
No.	Title	Writer(s)	Length
1.	"The Night Is Young and You're So Beautiful"	Irving Kahal; Billy Rose; Dana Suesse	3:41
2.	"I Can't Believe That You're in Love with Me"	Clarence Gaskill; Jimmy McHugh; Irving Mills	3:12
3.	"Young at Heart"	Carolyn Leigh; Johnny Richards	2:38
4.	"And I Love Her"	John Lennon; Paul McCartney	2:48
5.	"A Lovely Way to Spend an Evening"	Harold Adamson; Jimmy McHugh	2:41
6.	"You Do Something to Me"	Cole Porter	1:45

Side two
No.	Title	Writer(s)	Length
7.	"Embraceable You"	George Gershwin; Ira Gershwin	3:33
8.	"You Made Me Love You (I Didn't Want to Do It)"	Joseph McCarthy; James V. Monaco	3:09
9.	"While We're Young"	William Engvick; Mortimer Palitz; Alec Wilder	3:35
10.	"There's Love and There's Love and There's Love"	Sammy Cahn; Jimmy Van Heusen	3:53
11.	"Tenderly"	Walter Gross; Jack Lawrence	3:01
12.	"True Love"	Cole Porter	2:31
Total length:			36:27

=== Digital version ===
There's Love & There's Love & There's Love (download and streaming)
No.	Title	Writer(s)	Length
1.	"The Night Is Young and You're So Beautiful"	Kahal; Rose; Suesse	3:41
2.	"I Can't Believe That You're in Love with Me"	Gaskill; McHugh; Mills	3:12
3.	"Young at Heart"	Leigh; Richards	2:38
4.	"And I Love Her"	Lennon; McCartney	2:47
5.	"A Lovely Way to Spend an Evening"	Adamson; McHugh	2:41
6.	"You Do Something to Me"	Porter	1:45
7.	"Embraceable You"	Gershwin; Gershwin	3:32
8.	"You Made Me Love You"	McCarthy; Monaco	3:09
9.	"While We're Young"	Engvick; Palitz; Wilder	3:34
10.	"There's Love & There's Love & There's Love"	Cahn; Van Heusen	3:52
11.	"Tenderly"	Gross; Lawrence	3:00
12.	"True Love"	Porter	2:31
Total length:			36:26

== Personnel ==
All credits are adapted from the liner notes of There's Love & There's Love & There's Love.

- Michael Kapp – producer
- Nelson Riddle – arranger and conductor
- Norman Nishimura – photography
- Jack Jones – lead vocals

== Charts ==
Chart performance for There's Love & There's Love & There's Love
Chart (1965)	Peak position
US Billboard Top LP's	86
US Cashbox Top 100 Albums	71
US Record World 100 Top LP's	51

== Release history ==
Release history and formats for There's Love & There's Love & There's Love
Region	Date	Format	Label	Ref.
North America and UK	August 1965	LP; Vinyl	Kapp Records	
Worldwide	Circa 2020	Music download; streaming	Geffen Records	
