= If You Ever Leave Me (album) =

Studio album by Jack Jones
- Released: February 19, 1968
- Recorded: Early 1968
- Studios: RCA Victor's Music Center of the World, Hollywood, California
- Genres: Vocal pop; Easy listening
- Length: 30 minutes 32 seconds
- Labels: RCA Victor; LSP/LPM 3969
- Producer: Ernie Altschuler

Jack Jones chronology
Without Her (1967)	If You Ever Leave Me (1968)	Where Is Love? (1968)

Singles from If You Ever Leave Me
- 1. "If You Ever Leave Me" Released: January 1968

Professional ratings
Review scores
Source	Rating
The Encyclopedia of Popular Music	3/5 stars
Cashbox	Positive (Pop Pick)
Record World	Positive (Album Pick)

If You Ever Leave Me is a studio album by American singer Jack Jones released in early 1968 as his second release for RCA Victor. It reached the US album charts soon after its release, and received a mostly positive critical reception.

== Background and content ==
If You Ever Leave Me was the first of three studio albums that Jones released in 1968, with it being released shortly after his easy listening hit single also titled "If You Ever Leave Me". The single reached a high position on the Billboard Easy Listening chart and broke into the pop charts. It was issued by RCA Victor Records, a label which he had just started recording for after his move from Kapp Records.

The album was produced by Ernie Altschuler and arranged by Marty Paich. It featured covers of recent pop hits and other standards, as well as his own songs. Notably he offered interpretations of contemporary pop, country songs by Jimmy Webb, Leonard Bernstein & Stephen Sondheim, and Teddy Randazzo.

== Reception ==
The album received positive to mixed critical reception. Billboard believed that there's "Very excellent programming material here for easy listening stations, especially 'If You Ever Leave Me' and Jack Jones' versions of rock hits 'The Letter' and 'Goin' Out of My Head." They noted that "'Pretty' is a catchy little crowd pleaser, and Jones also does a winning 'By the Time I Get to Phoenix.'" On the other hand, The Belfast Telegraph was disappointed by the LP, believing that it "too many mediocre" tracks.

Record World said that "Jones includes his recent single with other choice cuts," noting the Paich arrangements. Cashbox magazine stated that "Jack Jones chants eleven pop ditties, creating a rich, mellow mood on such top efforts". The magazine believed that the "artist has a full-bodied, lyrical voice, and he employs it to good advantage throughout the album. The Jones boy should see a good deal of sales action with this quality LP." The Encyclopedia of Popular Music rated the album three stars as well.

== Chart performance ==
The album debuted on Billboard magazine's Top LP's chart in the issue dated April 27, 1968, peaking at No. 198 during a three-week run on the chart. It debuted on Cashbox magazine's Top 100 Albums chart in the issue also dated March 30, 1968, peaking at a much higher No. 60 during a nine-week run on the chart. The album debuted on Record World magazine's 100 Top LP's chart in the issue dated November 25, 1968, peaking at No. 79 during a five-week run on it.

The track "If You Ever Leave Me" debuted on the Billboard Hot 100 in the issue dated February 17, 1968, peaking at number 92 during a two-week run, and debuted on the magazine's Easy Listening chart November 18, peaking at number 5 during a seven-week run.

== Track listing ==
Side One
No.	Title	Writer(s)	Length
1.	"I'm Falling in Love Again" (From The Umbrellas of Cherbourg)	Teddy Randazzo; Michel Legrand; Bill Barberis	2:48
2.	"If You Ever Leave Me"	Tony Hatch; Jackie Trent	2:37
3.	"Goin' Out of My Head"	Teddy Randazzo; Bobby Weinstein	2:54
4.	"Pretty"	Bob Florence; Gail Allen	2:24
5.	"I'm Getting Sentimental over You"	Ned Washington; George Bassman	2:29
6.	"There Comes a Time" (From the Musical Production The Four Musketeers)	Laurie Johnson; Herbert Kretzmer	2:15

Side Two
No.	Title	Writer(s)	Length
7.	"The Letter"	Wayne Carson	2:06
8.	"By the Time I Get to Phoenix"	Jimmy Webb	3:22
9.	"Baby, Don't You Quit Now"	Johnny Mercer	3:05
10.	"Long Ago, Last Night"	Paul Francis Webster; Doug Talbert	3:26
11.	"Somewhere" (From the Musical Production West Side Story)	Leonard Bernstein; Stephen Sondheim	3:06
Total length:			30:32

== Production and personnel ==
Recorded in RCA Victor's Music Center of the World, Hollywood, California. Personnel include: producer Ernie Altschuler, arranger Marty Paich, and recording engineer Dick Bogert.

== Charts ==
=== Album ===
Chart (1968)	Peak position
US Billboard Top LP's	198
US Cashbox Top 100 Albums	60
US Record World 100 Top LP's	79

=== Singles ===
Single	Year	Chart	Peak position
"If You Ever Leave Me"	1968	US Billboard Hot 100	92
"If You Ever Leave Me"	1968	US Easy Listening	5
