= Emily (1964 song) =

Song
- Published: 1965
- Songwriters: Johnny Mandel, Johnny Mercer

"Emily" is a popular song composed by Johnny Mandel, with lyrics by Johnny Mercer. It was the title song to the 1964 film The Americanization of Emily. (The song wasn't sung in the movie, which is the reason that it couldn't be nominated for an Academy Award.) It has since been recorded by numerous artists, notably Bill Evans, Tony Bennett, and Barbra Streisand.

== Notable recordings ==
- Frank Sinatra recorded it twice, for his 1964 album Softly, as I Leave You and again in 1977 for an unreleased album. His second recording was released on The Complete Reprise Studio Recordings.
- Jack Jones for his album Dear Heart and Other Great Songs of Love (1964).
- Andy Williams released a version in 1964 as the B-side to his hit "Dear Heart" and it was also included in his album Andy Williams' Dear Heart (1965).
- Paul Desmond recorded the piece on his 1969 album Summertime.
- "Emily" became particularly associated with Bill Evans, who recorded it for the first time for his 1967 album Further Conversations with Myself. Evans also performed it live with saxophonist Stan Getz; it appeared on the album But Beautiful. Both Desmond and Evans included it in nearly every live performance to the end of their lives, with multiple performances on Evans' "Turn Out The Stars" (1980) and "The Last Waltz" (1980), and Desmond's "The Complete 1975 Toronto Recordings".
- The song was recorded by Tony Bennett for his album The Movie Song Album (1966).
- Barbra Streisand included the song on her album The Movie Album (2003).
- Kenny Barron included the song in his 2009 album Minor Blues.
- Julian Lage has performed "Emily" both as a solo guitar piece and with his trio featuring bassist Jorge Roeder and drummer Dave King. The song was recorded by the trio on the album Squint (2021).
