= Jack Jones Sings =

Studio album by Jack Jones
- Released: October 1966
- Studio: United Recording (LA)
- Genre: Traditional pop
- Label: Kapp Records

Jack Jones chronology
The Impossible Dream (1966)	Jack Jones Sings (1966)	Lady (1967)

Professional ratings
Review scores
Source	Rating
AllMusic	4.5/5 stars
The Encyclopedia of Popular Music	3/5 stars

Jack Jones Sings is a studio album by pop vocalist Jack Jones released in October 1966 by Kapp Records. It was arranged and conducted by Ralph Carmichael. Doug Talbert played piano.

== Background ==
The album was recorded in late 1966 in United Recording (LA). "A Day in the Life of a Fool" was released as a single and charted alongside the album's release. It hit No. 4 on the AC chart and No. 62 on the Billboard Hot 100. The album consists of many cover songs of standards and newer songs.

== Chart performance ==
Jack Jones Sings started to gain sales action in November of that year. The album debuted on the Billboard Top LPs chart in the issue dated November 26, 1966, and remained on the chart for 12 weeks, peaking at number 75. It debuted on the Cashbox Top 100 Albums chart in the issue dated November 12, 1966, remaining on the chart for 14 weeks and peaking at number 37. On Record World's 100 Top LP's chart, the album debuted in the issue dated November 5, 1966. It would peak at No. 26 in January 1967.

== Reception ==
The album received a positive critical reception upon its release. Record World put in its "Pick Hits" section, writing "The simplicity of the title is indicative of the mood of the album. Jack gives thoughtful, attractive readings of 'A Day in the Life of a Fool,' 'Street of Dreams,' 'I Don't Care Much,' 'Love After Midnight.' Blue ribbon." Cashbox stated that "The lovely tones that have brought Jack Jones to his current high point in the ranks of pop singers are amply displayed throughout this latest LP, so amply in fact that this set should become a particular favorite of Jones' fans." The magazine also called it a "delightful outing."

Retrospectively, Jason Ankeny on AllMusic reviewed the album, writing "...Jones exhibits a confidence and depth that more conventionally dynamic vocalists can't match", also noting that "...Doug Talbert's piano notes twinkle like stars, further underscoring the music's nocturnal atmosphere." The album also received a three-star rating from The Encyclopedia of Popular Music.

== Track listing ==
Side One
No.	Title	Writer(s)	Length
1.	"A Day in the Life of a Fool" (from Black Orpheus)	Luiz Bonfá; Carl Sigman	2:20
2.	"Autumn Leaves"	Joseph Kosma; Jacques Prévert; Johnny Mercer	3:19
3.	"Somewhere There's Someone"	Dave Heisler; Charles Nathan	2:16
4.	"Watch What Happens" (from The Umbrellas of Cherbourg)	Michel Legrand; Norman Gimbel	2:43
5.	"People Will Say We're in Love"	Richard Rodgers; Oscar Hammerstein II	1:49
6.	"Love After Midnight"	Bert Kaempfert; Joe Seneca; Herbert Rehbein	2:40

Side Two
No.	Title	Writer(s)	Length
1.	"Somewhere, My Love" (Lara's Theme from Dr. Zhivago)	Maurice Jarre; Paul Francis Webster	2:20
2.	"The Shining Sea" from "The Russians Are Coming, the Russians Are Coming"	Johnny Mandel; Peggy Lee	3:16
3.	"The Face I Love"	Ray Gilbert; Carlos Pingarilho; Marcos Valle; Paulo Sérgio Valle	1:49
4.	"Street of Dreams"	Victor Young; Sam M. Lewis	2:31
5.	"The Snows of Yesteryear"	Fred Talbert; Paul Francis Webster	2:49
6.	"I Don't Care Much"	John Kander; Fred Ebb	2:24

== Charts ==
Chart performance for Jack Jones Sings
Chart (1966–1967)	Peak position
US Billboard Top LPs	75
US Cashbox 100 Top Albums	37
US Record World 100 Top LP's	26
