= Lollipops and Roses (song) =

Song by Tony Velona

"Lollipops and Roses" is a song composed by Tony Velona. The best-known version was a Grammy Award-winning version by Jack Jones, which was recorded and released in the fall of 1961 on the Kapp label, and which charted in 1962. The Jack Jones recording went to number twelve on the Easy Listening chart.

== Chart performance ==
Chart (1962)	Peak position
US Billboard Hot 100	66
US Billboard Easy Listening	12

== Steve Lawrence version ==
"Lollipops and Roses"

Song by Steve Lawrence

from the album Winners!
- Released: 1963
- Length: 3:00
- Label: Columbia Records
- Songwriter: Tony Velona
- Producer: Al Kasha

Steve Lawrence covered the song for his album Winners!, released in January 1963. It was released as a single in the Philippines, where it topped the national chart for seven straight weeks beginning in July 1965.
