= Jack Jones Paints a Tribute to Tony Bennett =

Studio album by Jack Jones
- Released: October 13, 1998
- Recorded: July 14 – 16, 1998
- Studio: Recording Arts Productions
- Genres: Vocal jazz; easy listening
- Length: 53 minutes 49 seconds
- Label: Honest Entertainment

Jack Jones chronology
White Christmas (1998)	Jack Jones Paints a Tribute to Tony Bennett (1998)	The Wind Beneath My Wings (2002)

My Kind of Town is a tribute album to Tony Bennett by American singer Jack Jones, recorded in the summer of 1998 and released late that year by Honest Entertainment. The album became his final chart entry and received a positive critical reception as well.

== Overview ==
Recorded with some help from jazz pianist Mike Rienzi, Jack Jones Paints a Tribute to Tony Bennett was the second of two albums that Jones released in 1998. The album featured covers of popular songs by American singer Tony Bennett. Although unusually long for a Jones album, the tribute album returned Jones to the album charts after a nearly 21-year absence from them. Jack Jones Paints a Tribute to Tony Bennett was nominated for Best Traditional Pop Vocal Performance at the 41st Annual Grammy Awards, marking it as his first album to be nominated for any type of award.

== Chart performance ==
The album peaked on the UK Top Jazz & Blues Albums chart in the issue dated April 10, 1999, in its only week on the chart and was Jones's final charting album in any country.

== Reception ==
Professional ratings
Review scores
Source	Rating
AllMusic	3/5 stars
The Encyclopedia of Popular Music	3/5 stars

Alex Henderson on AllMusic reviewed the album and said that, "The singer is certainly quite capable of depth, as he demonstrates on this inspired tribute to one of his main influences, Tony Bennett". Henderson called the album ". . . one of the best things he has ever done" and he also stated, "Forget about the theme from The Love Boat; A Tribute to Tony Bennett is what Jones should be known for."

== Track listing ==
No.	Title	Writer(s)	Length
1.	"Skylark"	Hoagy Carmichael / Johnny Mercer	3:47
2.	"All My Tomorrows"	Sammy Cahn / Jimmy Van Heusen	2:49
3.	"Rags to Riches"	Richard Adler / Jerry "Ruby" Ross	3:29
4.	"I Left My Heart in San Francisco"	George Cory / Douglass Cross	5:16
5.	"Fly Me to the Moon"	Bart Howard	4:37
6.	"Who Can I Turn To (When Nobody Needs Me)"	Leslie Bricusse / Anthony Newley	3:22
7.	"The Shadow of Your Smile"	Johnny Mandel / Paul Francis Webster	4:55
8.	"Just in Time"	Betty Comden / Adolph Green / Jule Styne	3:22
9.	"For Once in My Life"	Ron Miller / Orlando Murden	2:29
10.	"It Amazes Me"	Cy Coleman / Carolyn Leigh	6:27
11.	"You Must Believe in Spring"	Alan Bergman / Marilyn Bergman / Jacques Demy / Michel Legrand	2:09
12.	"Because of You"	Arthur Hammerstein / Dudley Wilkinson	2:55
13.	"The Good Life"	Sacha Distel / Jack Reardon	3:46
14.	"One for My Baby (and One More for the Road)"	Harold Arlen / Johnny Mercer	4:26
Total length:			53:49

== Accolades ==
Organization	Year	Category	Result	Ref.
Grammy Awards	1998	Best Traditional Pop Vocal Performance	Nominated	

== Charts ==
Chart peaks for Jack Jones Paints a Tribute to Tony Bennett
Chart (1998)	Peak position
UK Top Jazz & Blues Albums	17
