= Where Is Love? (Jack Jones album) =

Studio album by Jack Jones
- Released: August 1968
- Recorded: Summer of 1968
- Studios: RCA Victor's Music Center of the World, Hollywood, California
- Genres: Vocal pop; easy listening
- Length: 33:51
- Labels: RCA Victor Records (LSP-4048)
- Producer: Ernie Altschulter

Jack Jones chronology
Curtain Time (1968)	Where Is Love? (1968)	L.A. Break Down (1968)

Singles from Where Is Love?
- 1. "I Really Want to Know You" Released: June 1968

Where Is Love? is the twenty-fourth studio album by American pop vocalist Jack Jones, originally released in August 1968 by RCA Victor Records. It was his second studio album issued that year, following his transition from Kapp Records the previous year. The project included a mixture of new and old cover songs. Selections included show tunes, recent pop hits, and themes from films. Pianist Doug Talbert was featured on the album as well.

The album had a lead single titled "I Really Want to Know You," which hit the adult-oriented charts in July of that year. The album was not a big commercial success for Jones, although it did reach the bottom half of the US album charts. Results were published by Billboard, Cashbox, and Record World. Chart positions varied from number 195 to number 104. Where Is Love? also received a positive-to-mixed contemporary reception, with several reviewers commenting on the song selection and Jones' vocal performances. Similar style albums followed.

== Background and content ==
"Old Man River"
Sample of "Old Man River". The song is the only standard in the LP, in a soft-rock style by Jones.

Jack Jones was a popular easy listening and pop singer in the 1960s, recording with Kapp Records and gaining several hits. In late 1967 he switched labels to RCA Victor Records. His chart performance became more modest, although his releases remained similar. In June 1968 Jones scored another Billboard Easy Listening top-twenty single titled "I Really Want to Know You". Critics noted that it featured "snappy folk-country flavored guitar work" in a ballad setting. An album titled after the song "Where Is Love?" followed soon after, including the single.

The recordings for Where Is Love? were taken from sessions held in the summer of 1968 in RCA Victor's Music Center of the World, Hollywood, California. The songs were arranged and conducted by Pat Williams. Recordings were handled by producer Ernie Altschulter and engineer Mickey Crofford. As with his previous albums, the cover photo features Jones with short hair and in a tuxedo.

Besides the single, the album mainly consisted of covers of recent hits. The title track was from the musical, later turned into a film Oliver!. "Old Man River" was the only standard in the project. It was originally a 1927 show tune. Other selections included "Suzanne" by Canadian poet Leonard Cohen, "It's Nice to Be with You", which was a hit for British band The Monkees, and "Light My Fire", which was a bossa-nova rocker and big hit for Puerto Rican musician José Feliciano around the time of the album's release. A version of the song "Valley of the Dolls" was also recorded, originally appearing as the theme in the 1967 film Valley of the Dolls. "Lonely Afternoon" was co-written by arranger and conductor Pat Williams, appearing in the 1968 film How Sweet It Is!, with the soundtrack of it scored by Williams as well. On the other hand, "(Waitin') 'Round the Rebound" was composed by bandleader Percy Faith and was one of the tracks for his 1968 LP For Those in Love, which also reached the US pop album charts. "Good Times" was written and recorded first by American country singer Willie Nelson.

== Release ==
Where Is Love? was originally released in early August 1968 on the RCA Victor label in multiple territories. It was the twenty-fourth, the second of the year, studio collection released in Jones' career. The album was distributed as a vinyl LP, containing six songs on side one and five on side two of the record. It was only available in stereo sound. In September of that year, it was also issued as an 8-track cartridge by the same label. Decades later, the album was re-released on Sony Music Entertainment to digital and streaming sites.

== Reception ==
Professional ratings
Review scores
Source	Rating
The Encyclopedia of Popular Music	2/5 stars
Cashbox	Positive (Pop Pick)
Record World	Positive (Album of the Week)

=== Contemporary reception ===
The album received a positive critical reception upon its release. Cashbox reviewed the album on August 17, and stated that "Jones is one of the more stylish pop singers on the contemporary scene, and this new LP is a fine example of his expert musicianship." They said that "In rich, warm, romantic tones, the artist renders the title tune (from the musical production Oliver!), 'Light My Fire,' 'Good Times,' and 'It’s Nice To Be With You.' The chanter’s followers should snap this one up." Record World believed that the album is "As usual, an impeccable collection of songs from Jack." They noted that "Most of the songs are new, and some are familiar, recent top-40 fare. 'Light My Fire,' 'Valley of the Dolls,' 'Suzanne,' 'Old Man River' and eight more".

Other reviews ranged from positive to mixed. The Daily Breeze believed that "Jones has his best LP since moving to Victor label in this one". The San Antonio Express described the album as a "pleasant recording", but said that "...it offers little more. Jones in his easy-going style renders popular hits". The Valley News wrote that "If your thing is good music, then try Jack Jones' new album Where Is Love?." The publication believed that "Old Man River" was a "real knockout". Their review gave an overview of the album's other tracks as well. The Times Record described Jones as "the son of fine tenor", and noted that the "tunes bring you back to now".

=== Retrospective reviews ===
The album did not receive retrospective reviews. It was given a two-star rating by The Encyclopedia of Popular Music in 2007 by British music writer Colin Larkin. He had rated all of Jones' RCA Victor albums two or three stars, although he referred to them as "highly regarded".

== Chart performance ==
Where Is Love? reached the US album charts, though its presence on them varied. It debuted on Billboard magazine's Top LP's chart in the issue dated September 21, 1968, peaking at No. 195 during a three-week run on the chart. It entered Cashbox magazine's Looking Ahead Albums chart, which was a continuation of the Top 100 Albums chart, in the issue dated September 7, 1968, peaking at No. 104 during a four-week run on the chart. The album debuted on Record World magazine's LP's Coming Up chart in the issue dated September 14, 1968, peaking at No. 119 during a three-week run.

== Track listings ==
=== Vinyl version ===
Side one
No.	Title	Writer(s)	Length
1.	"Where Is Love?"	Lionel Bart	4:10
2.	"Light My Fire"	Jim Morrison; Robby Krieger; John Densmore; Ray Manzarek	2:38
3.	"Suzanne"	Leonard Cohen	3:05
4.	"Lonely Afternoon"	Pat Williams; Spence Maxwell	3:03
5.	"(Waitin') 'Round the Rebound"	Percy Faith; Spence Maxwell	2:28
6.	"I Really Want to Know You"	Barry Mann; Cynthia Weil	2:50
Total length:			18:14

Side two
No.	Title	Writer(s)	Length
7.	"Good Times"	Willie Nelson	2:58
8.	"Valley of the Dolls"	André Previn; Dory Previn	3:22
9.	"It's Nice to Be With You"	Jerry Goldstein	2:30
10.	"Dreams Are All I Have of You"	Earl E. Lawrence	2:55
11.	"Old Man River"	Jerome Kern; Oscar Hammerstein II	2:52
Total length:			14:37

=== Digital version ===
Where Is Love? (download and streaming)
No.	Title	Writer(s)	Length
1.	"Where Is Love?"	Lionel Bart	4:16
2.	"Light My Fire"	Jim Morrison; Robby Krieger; John Densmore; Ray Manzarek	2:42
3.	"Suzanne"	Leonard Cohen	3:09
4.	"Lonely Afternoon"	Pat Williams; Spence Maxwell	3:10
5.	"(Waitin') 'Round the Rebound"	Percy Faith; Spence Maxwell	2:33
6.	"I Really Want to Know You"	Barry Mann; Cynthia Weil	2:52
7.	"Good Times"	Willie Nelson	3:07
8.	"Valley of the Dolls"	André Previn; Dory Previn	3:26
9.	"It's Nice to Be With You"	Jerry Goldstein	2:35
10.	"Dreams Are All I Have of You"	Earl E. Lawrence	2:59
11.	"Old Man River"	Jerome Kern; Oscar Hammerstein II	2:57
Total length:			33:51

== Personnel ==
All credits are adapted from the liner notes of Where Is Love?.

- Ernie Altschulter – producer
- Mickey Crofford – recording engineer
- Pat Williams – arranger and conductor
- Doug Talbert – piano
- Jack Jones – vocals

== Charts ==
Chart performance for Where Is Love?
Chart (1968)	Peak position
US Billboard Top LP's	195
US Cashbox Looking Ahead Albums	104
US Record World LP's Coming Up	119

== Release history ==
Release history and formats, with other details for Where Is Love?
Region	Date	Format	Label	Ref.
United States	September 1968	8-track cartridge tape	RCA Victor Records	
North America and UK	August 1968	LP; Vinyl	RCA Victor Records	
North America and UK	Circa 2020	Music download; streaming	Sony Music	
