= Where Love Has Gone (album) =

Studio album by Jack Jones
- Released: July 1964
- Recorded: Mid 1964
- Genres: Traditional pop; Easy listening
- Length: 35 minutes 16 seconds
- Labels: Kapp Records (KL 1396; KS 3396)
- Producer: Michael Kapp

Jack Jones chronology
Bewitched (1964)	Where Love Has Gone (1964)	The Jack Jones Christmas Album (1964)

Singles from Where Love Has Gone
- 1. "Where Love Has Gone" Released: August 1964

Where Love Has Gone is a studio album by American singer Jack Jones released in mid-1964 by Kapp Records. It successfully reached the US charts and received a highly positive critical reception.

== Background and content ==
Where Love Has Gone was the third of four albums that Jones released in 1964, following the title track's success. Although released at the height of the British Invasion, the LP was an immediate commercial hit. It proved Jones' appeal and the lasting popularity of traditional pop, even while pop-rock British acts were dominating the charts and airplay. The album contained "subtle" and "focused" cover versions of multiple standards, according to critics. It was released in July 1964 by Kapp Records, and was available both in mono and stereo. Heavy promotion by Kapp and Paramount Pictures was done for the album after its release.

== Critical reception ==
=== Contemporary ===
Gene Lees on Stereo Review wrote that "He has a great voice and superb control, and he is the only singer I've heard who can take Sinatra material," saying that Jones' handling of the standards "is so fresh and personal," concluding, "so without exaggeration, that these might be called the definitive post-Sinatra interpretations." He also believed that "Pete King and Harry Betts have both written excellent arrangements." Cashbox in its "Pop Picks" reviews stated that "The songster's velvet tones and ultra-smooth delivery are potently showcased," calling the songs "sophisticated beauties."

=== Retrospectives ===
Professional ratings
Review scores
Source	Rating
AllMusic	4/5 stars
The Encyclopedia of Popular Music	3/5 stars

Retrospectives were also positive. Jason Ankeny of AllMusic said that the album "beautifully distills the essence of Jack Jones. A subtle, focused record that draws on jazz and pop elements but steadfastly avoids genre pigeonholing, it's first and foremost a collection of romantic standards re-imagined in ways that stay true to their writers' intent yet reveal new gradations of meaning in their familiar lyrics." The Encyclopedia of Popular Music gave the album a three-star rating as well. The rating meant that it was a "good" from Jones and "therefore recommended"

== Chart performance ==
The album debuted on Billboard magazine's Top LP's chart in the issue dated August 29, 1965, peaking at No. 62 during a twenty-three-week run on the chart. It debuted on Cashbox magazine's Top 100 Albums chart in the issue also dated August 22, 1964, peaking at No. 22 during an twelve-week run on the chart.

The album's title track debuted on the Billboard Hot 100 in the issue dated August 15, 1964, peaking at number 62, and debuted on the magazine's Easy Listening chart August 22, peaking at number 12. The track debuted on the Cashbox singles chart in the issue dated August 22, 1964, peaking at number 69.

== Track listing ==
Side one
No.	Title	Writer(s)	Length
1.	"Where Love Has Gone"	Sammy Cahn; Jimmy Van Heusen	2:29
2.	"Willow Weep for Me"	Ann Ronell	3:51
3.	"It Never Entered My Mind"	Lorenz Hart; Richard Rodgers	2:32
4.	"Here's That Rainy Day"	Johnny Burke; Jimmy Van Heusen	3:13
5.	"Lush Life"	Billy Strayhorn	3:24
6.	"To Love and Be Loved"	Sammy Cahn; Jimmy Van Heusen	3:12

Side two
No.	Title	Writer(s)	Length
7.	"People"	Bob Merrill; Jule Styne	2:20
8.	"Ev'ry Time We Say Goodbye"	Cole Porter	2:55
9.	"What's New?"	Johnny Burke; Robert Haggart	2:08
10.	"The Lorelei"	Barclay Allen; Rosetta Bent; Jody Gladstone; Joey Gladstone	3:11
11.	"Guess I'll Hang My Tears Out to Dry"	Sammy Cahn; Jule Styne	3:50
12.	"By Myself"	Howard Dietz; Arthur Schwartz	2:11
Total length:			35:16

== Production and personnel ==
The album was recorded in mid-1964 and produced by Michael Kapp. The arrangers/conductors who worked on the album include: Pete King and Harry Betts.

== Charts ==
=== Album ===
Chart (1964)	Peak position
US Billboard Top LP's	62
US Cashbox Top 100 Albums	36
US Cashbox Top 50 Stereo	22

=== Singles ===
Single	Year	Chart	Peak position
"Where Love Has Gone"	1964	US Billboard Hot 100	62
"Where Love Has Gone"	1964	US Cashbox Top 100 Singles	69
"Where Love Has Gone"	1964	US Easy Listening	12
