= For the "In" Crowd =

Studio album by Jack Jones
- Released: January 1966
- Recorded: 1965, New York City
- Genres: Pop-rock; Easy listening
- Length: 27 minutes 58 seconds
- Labels: Kapp; KL 1465/KS 3465
- Producer: Michael Kapp

Jack Jones chronology
There's Love & There's Love & There's Love (1965)	For the "In" Crowd (1966)	The Impossible Dream (1966)

Singles from For the "In" Crowd
- 1. "Just Yesterday" Released: September 1965; 2. "Love Bug" Released: November 1965; 3. "The Weekend" Released: January 1966

For the "In" Crowd is the nineteenth studio album by American singer Jack Jones, released in January 1966 by Kapp Records. The project saw him continue recording with producer Michael Kapp and working again with arranger Don Costa. For the "In" Crowd was met with a mostly positive critical reception, and also reached the pop charts.

== Background ==
In 1965, Jack Jones was still having regular pop and easy listening hits. At the start of the year he had his final top 20 pop hit and another Easy Listening chart topper with "The Race Is On", and in the middle of the year he hit the top 10 on the easy listening charts again with "Just Yesterday". This led him to continue recording contemporary-oriented singles like before, and later to record an album aimed at the current pop markets, titled For the "In" Crowd, although his personal style didn't change.

== Recording and content ==
It contained a total of 12 tracks, with them being split into six on side one, and six on side two, with the album's runtime clocking in just shy of 28 minutes. The album was made up of modern pop hits like "Sunshine, Lollipops and Rainbows" by Lesley Gore, "What the World Needs Now Is Love" by Jackie DeShannon, "1-2-3" by Len Barry, and "Yesterday" by The Beatles. All of the mentioned songs were issued as singles in 1965. But it also contained some different songs like his hit single "Love Bug" highlighted on the front cover, which had a country touch and originals like "The Weekend" and "Wildflower". It also featured a swinging version of the title song "The 'In' Crowd".

== Critical reception ==
Professional ratings
Review scores
Source	Rating
Encyclopedia of Popular Music	3/5 stars
Cashbox	Positive (Pop Picks)
Record World	Positive (Pick Hits)

For the "In" Crowd was given a positive critical response following its release, and was noted for its commerciality. Cashbox magazine stated that the "highly popular with the lovers of the tender romance ballad" Jack Jones makes an appearance in the rock idiom with a "package that should build his following even larger. Highlighted by winners from recent rock crops, including 'What The World Needs Now Is Love' and 'Sunshine, Lollipops And Rainbows'. The buoyancy and easy Jones stylings make the LP a strong contender for chart honors." Record World magazine believed that the album was fresh; "The Jones boy scanned the recent bestseller charts for this package and selected a bunch of tunes well suited to his styling. The songs, arranged and conducted by the ubiquitous, tireless, peerless Don Costa are fresh and compelling. 'What the World Needs Now Is Love,' 'Yesterday,' 'Baby I'm Yours,' 'The Weekend' and a pretty newie, 'Wildflower.' It was given a three-star rating by Encyclopedia of Popular Music as well. Don Costa who had also worked with Jones on previous albums said that:

Jack is one of the few singers today who can adapt and interpret today's music without basically changing his own style.

— Costa's observation, Liner notes

== Release, chart performance and singles ==
For the "In" Crowd was released by Kapp Records in January 1966 (KL 1465/KS 3465) and was the nineteenth studio album of his career. In the United Kingdom it was released by London Records (HAR 8286), with the front and back covers being changed a little bit. The album was offered as a vinyl LP, both in stereo and mono. It debuted on Billboard magazine's Top LP's chart in the issue dated March 26, 1966, peaking at No. 147 during a two-week run on the chart. The album debuted on Cashbox magazine's Looking Ahead Albums chart in the issue dated January 29, 1966, peaking at No. 102 during a seven-week run on the chart. The album debuted on Record World magazine's 100 Top LP's chart in the issue dated February 5, 1966, peaking at No. 75 during a four-week run on the chart.

The project included three singles. The first was "Just Yesterday" issued in September 1965. It reached the bottom half of the pop charts, (No. 73 Billboard Hot 100, No. 83 Cashbox Top 100 Singles). The single also peaked at No. 5 on the Billboard Easy Listening chart. The next single was "Love Bug" issued in November 1965. It was the most successful one included in the album, it quickly reached No. 71 on the Billboard Hot 100 and No. 56 on the Cashbox Top 100 Singles, taking the No. 5 spot on the Easy Listening chart as well. The single appeared on RPM's Adult Contemporary chart too, reaching No. 6. The third and final single was "The Weekend" with "Wildflower" on the B-side, issued in January 1966 like the album. It was ranked lower than the previous ones, bubbling under the Hot 100 at No. 23 and just reaching the Cashbox Top 100 Singles at No. 100. "The Weekend" also peaked at No. 20 on the Easy Listening chart.

== Track listing ==
Side One
No.	Title	Writer(s)	Length
1.	"What the World Needs Now Is Love"	Burt Bacharach; Hal David	3:10
2.	"Yesterday"	John Lennon; Paul McCartney	2:21
3.	"You've Got Your Troubles"	Roger Cook; Roger Greenaway	2:52
4.	"1-2-3"	Leonard Borisoff; John Madara; David White	2:17
5.	"Wildflower"	Estelle Levitt; Ruth Sexton	2:20
6.	"Love Bug"	Wayne Kemp; Curtis Wayne	1:55
Total length:			14:54

Side Two
No.	Title	Writer(s)	Length
1.	"The In Crowd"	Billy Page	2:19
2.	"Baby I'm Yours"	Van McCoy	1:51
3.	"Just Yesterday"	Klaus Ogermann; Carl Sigman	2:22
4.	"The Weekend"	Teddy Randazzo; Lou Stallman; Benny Verbi; Bob Weinstein	2:05
5.	"I Want to Meet Her"	Teddy Randazzo; Lou Stallman; Bob Weinstein	2:52
6.	"Sunshine, Lollipops and Rainbows"	Marvin Hamlisch; Howard Liebling	1:37
Total length:			13:16

== Chart performance ==
Chart performance for For the "In" Crowd
Chart (1966)	Peak position
US Billboard Top LPs	147
US Cashbox Top 100 Albums	102
US Record World 100 Top LP's	75

=== Singles ===
Single	Year	Chart	Peak position
"Just Yesterday"	1965	US Billboard Hot 100	73
"Just Yesterday"	1965	US Billboard Easy Listening	5
"Just Yesterday"	1965	US Cashbox Top 100 Singles	83
"Love Bug"	1965	US Billboard Hot 100	71
"Love Bug"	1965	US Cashbox Top 100 Singles	56
"Love Bug"	1965	US Billboard Easy Listening	5
"Love Bug"	1965	CAN RPM Adult Contemporary	6
"The Weekend"	1966	US Billboard Bubbling Under Hot 100	123
"The Weekend"	1966	US Cashbox Top 100 Singles	100
"The Weekend"	1966	US Billboard Easy Listening	20

== Release history ==
Release history and formats for For the "In" Crowd
Region	Date	Format	Label	Ref.
United States and Canada	January 1966	Vinyl (LP)	Kapp	
United Kingdom	Early 1966	Vinyl (LP)	London Records	
Worldwide	2020s	Digital; streaming	Geffen Records	

== Personnel ==
- Producer – Michael Kapp
- Arranger and conductor – Don Costa
- Liner notes – Peter J. Livingston
- Cover photo – Alex Greco
