= Wives and Lovers =

1963 song by Burt Bacharach and Hal David

Single by Jack Jones

from the album Wives and Lovers
- B-side: "Toys in the Attic"
- Released: September 1963
- Recorded: 1963
- Studio: Columbia 30th Street Studio, New York City
- Genre: Traditional pop
- Length: 2:29
- Label: Kapp
- Songwriters: Burt Bacharach, Hal David

Jack Jones singles chronology
"That's the Way I'll Come to You" (1963)	"Wives and Lovers" (1963)	"Love with the Proper Stranger" (1964)

"Wives and Lovers" is a 1963 song by Burt Bacharach and Hal David. It has been recorded by numerous male and female vocalists, instrumentalists and ensembles.

== Jack Jones recording ==
Most notably the song was recorded by Jack Jones in 1963, for Kapp Records. He was accompanied by an orchestra directed by Pete King. The B-side was "Toys in the Attic." This recording earned the 1964 Grammy Award for Best Vocal Performance, Male, In the US, it peaked at number fourteen on the Hot 100 and number nine on the Easy Listening chart.

== Background ==
"Wives and Lovers" is a song of advice to married women, to stay attractive and attentive to their husbands ("wives should always be lovers, too") to avoid their husbands straying with "girls at the office". In the first line, the everywoman wife is addressed "Hey little girl", before a "warning" to "fix your make up" and "run to his [i.e., her husband's] arms the moment he comes home to you." The song originated when Bacharach and David were asked to write a song with the title "Wives and Lovers", on the theme of marital infidelity, as a promotional tie-in for the 1963 film Wives and Lovers. The song did not appear in the film but was intended simply to promote the film, making it what was known at the time as an "exploitation song". Similarly, the song "(The Man Who Shot) Liberty Valance", which Bacharach and David wrote in 1962, promoted, but was not featured in, the film of the same name.

== Other versions ==
- Frank Sinatra with Count Basie and His Orchestra – It Might as Well Be Swing (Reprise, 1964) While the song was in 3/4 time, the performance was in 4/4 time; according to Bacharach, the record's producer Quincy Jones said "the Basie band can’t play in 3/4."

== Song in popular culture ==
- The song is featured playing on a radio in the very first "For Better or For Worse" comic strip by Lynn Johnston.
