= Tony Velona =

American author, lyricist, and composer

Anthony Velona (November 16, 1920 – January 31, 1986) was an American author, lyricist, and composer. Velona was born in Jersey City, New Jersey.

He wrote or co-wrote numerous songs including the 1955 hit Domani, the 1962 hit Lollipops and Roses, and the 1966 hit Music to Watch Girls By.
