= Without Her (album) =

Studio album by Jack Jones
- Released: November 1967
- Recorded: Late 1967
- Studios: RCA Victor's Music Center of the World, Hollywood, California
- Genres: Traditional pop; Easy listening
- Length: 29 minutes 34 seconds
- Labels: RCA Victor: LSP 3911 (US); RD 7935 (UK)
- Producer: Ernie Altschuler

Jack Jones chronology
Our Song (1967)	Without Her (1967)	What the World Needs Now Is Love! (1968)

Singles from Without Her
- 1. "Live for Life" Released: November 1967

Without Her is a studio album by American singer Jack Jones released in late 1967 as his first release for American record label RCA Victor Records. The album received a positive critical reception and made US chart appearances through November 1967 to January 1968.

== Background, content, and release ==
Without Her was the final of three albums that Jones released in 1967, with it released shortly after his easy listening hit single "Live for Life" from the United Artists motion picture Live For Life. The single reached a high position on the Billboard Easy Listening chart. It was issued by RCA Victor Records, a label which he had just started recording for after his move from Kapp Records. In January 1968, the album was made available on an 8-track cartridge format by the label. The album was produced by Ernie Altschuler and arranged by Marty Paich. The album featured covers of recent pop hits and other standards, as well as his own songs. Notably he offered interpretations of contemporary pop songs by Harry Nilsson, Burt Bacharach & Hal David, and Paul Simon.

== Reception ==
Professional ratings
Review scores
Source	Rating
The Encyclopedia of Popular Music	3/5 stars
Cashbox	Positive (Pop Pick)
Record World	Positive (Album Pick)

The album received a positive reception. Billboard believed "His emotional recital of Simon and Garfunkel's 'Homeward Bound' is the standout selection", and noted "But the rest of the material is also first-rate." Record World stated that "Jones' first album for RCA Victor is a sumptuous one with gorgeous readings of Nilsson's 'Without Her,' 'Live for Life,' etc." Cashbox magazine said that "Here's a smooth, easy-flowing package from romantic songster Jack Jones", noting that it "is sure to prove a fast moving item in the marketplace." The Encyclopedia of Popular Music referred to the album as "highly regarded".

== Chart performance ==
The album debuted on Billboard magazine's Top LP's chart in the issue dated December 16, 1967, peaking at No. 146 during a seven-week run on the chart. It debuted on Cashbox magazine's Top 100 Albums chart in the issue also dated November 18, 1967, peaking at No. 66 during a twelve-week run on the chart. The album debuted on Record World magazine's 100 Top LP's chart in the issue dated November 25, 1967, peaking at No. 61 during a seven-week run on it.

The track "Live for Life" debuted on the Billboard Hot 100 in the issue dated December 2, 1967, peaking at number 99 during a two-week run, and debuted on the magazine's Easy Listening chart November 18, peaking at number 9 during a ten-week run.

== Track listing ==
Side One
No.	Title	Writer(s)	Length
1.	"Without Her"	Harry Nilsson	2:05
2.	"The Look of Love"	Burt Bacharach; Hal David	2:22
3.	"Don't Talk to Me"	Gillespie	2:43
4.	"You and the Night and the Music"	Howard Dietz; Arthur Schwartz	2:10
5.	"I Can't Get Started"	Vernon Duke; Ira Gershwin	2:44
6.	"Homeward Bound"	Paul Simon	2:41

Side Two
No.	Title	Writer(s)	Length
7.	"Live for Life"	Francis Lai; Norman Gimbel	2:43
8.	"Hushed Whispers"	Allen; Florence	2:57
9.	"Isn't It Romantic?"	Richard Rodgers; Lorenz Hart	2:53
10.	"Mean to Me"	Fred E. Ahlert; Roy Turk	3:03
11.	"For All We Know"	J. Fred Coots; Sam M. Lewis	2:53
Total length:			29:34

== Production and personnel ==
Recorded in RCA Victor's Music Center of the World, Hollywood, California. Personnel include: producer Ernie Altschuler, arranger Marty Paich, and recording engineer Dick Bogert.

== Charts ==
=== Album ===
Chart (1967–1968)	Peak position
US Billboard Top LP's	146
US Cashbox Top 100 Albums	66
US Record World 100 Top LP's	61

=== Singles ===
Single	Year	Chart	Peak position
"Live for Life"	1967	US Billboard Hot 100	99
"Live for Life"	1967	US Easy Listening	9
