= Kapp Records =

American record label

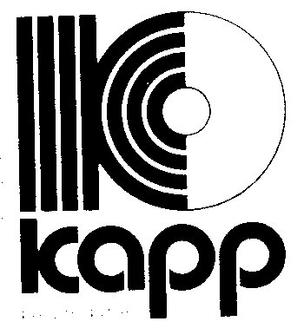
- Parent company: MCA Inc. (original), Universal Music Group (current)
- Founded: 1954
- Founder: David Kapp
- Defunct: 1973
- Status: Inactive
- Distributors: MCA Records; Universal Music Group
- Genre: Various
- Country of origin: U.S.

David Kapp
- David Kapp and Danny Kaye, 1946

Background information
- Born: David Kapp; August 7, 1904; Chicago, Illinois
- Died: March 1, 1976 New York City
- Genres: Country, pop, rock, R&B, jazz, musical theatre
- Occupation: Record producer
- Years active: 1930s–1960s
- Labels: Decca, RCA Victor, Kapp

Kapp Records was an independent record label started in 1954 by David Kapp, brother of Jack Kapp (who set up American Decca Records in 1934). David Kapp founded his own label after stints with Decca and RCA Victor. Kapp licensed its records to London Records for release in the UK.

In 1967, David Kapp sold his label to MCA Inc. and the label was placed under Uni Records management; Kapp was consolidated with MCA's other record labels in 1971 and, in 1973, MCA Records released the last Kapp record. Catalogue albums that continued to sell were renumbered and reissued on the MCA label.

Kapp's subsidiaries included Medallion Records (an audiophile label), Congress Records, Leader Records, and Four Corners Records with its "4 Corners of the World" logo. Four Corners was formed to promote European artists, such as Françoise Hardy, Raymond Lefèvre, and the Barclay Singers.

Today, the Kapp Records catalog is owned by MCA's successor-in-interest Universal Music Group through its Geffen Records subsidiary.

== History ==
- 1954: Kapp Records was created by David Kapp.
- 1955: Kapp Records released "Autumn Leaves" played by Roger Williams (pianist) that became the number one song in America on Billboard Top 100.
- 1960: Kapp Records released one of the first cover versions of songs from The Sound of Music, which was running on Broadway at that time. The Pete King Chorale was featured on the album.
- 1964: Kapp Records released "Hello Dolly" sung by Louis Armstrong that became the number one song in America on Billboard Top 100, two months after The Beatles' arrived from England. The label also distributed American releases by another successful British Invasion group, The Searchers.
- 1966: The record label released the original cast album of Man of La Mancha, perhaps its most successful cast album.
- 1967: David Kapp sold his label to MCA Inc. and it became a division of Uni Records.
- 1973: MCA released the last Kapp record. The catalog and artist roster was absorbed by MCA Records.
- 2003: MCA Records is absorbed into Geffen Records, which currently manages Kapp's pop/rock/R&B catalogs. The country, jazz, and musical theatre catalogs are now managed by MCA Nashville Records, GRP Records, and Decca Broadway, respectively. Decca Broadway released a remastered version of the Man of La Mancha original cast album in 2001.

== Label variations ==
Logo during most of the 1960s

Throughout Kapp's history, its logo was a stylized "K" incorporating a phonograph record design. Three versions of this logo appeared during the company's history. Until 1970, this logo also appeared on a drum major's cap in a wordplay of the label's name.

- 1950s: Stylized "K/record" logo and KAPP at top of either red/white, silver/maroon or purplish red/white labels.
- Early 1960s: Black label with white "K/record" logo and KAPP in red at top, a similar design had a red drum major cap and KAPP in yellow at top.
- Mid to late 1960s: Black label with red drum major cap (showing "K/record" logo in yellow) and KAPP in black letters in white box at left for singles, at top for albums.
- 1970-1972: Purple, red, orange and yellow label with new "K" logo, either in black or in white inside black box, at left. (A few 1970s releases were also pressed with the mid-to-late 1960s black label.)

== Roster ==
- Eddie Albert
- Louis Armstrong
- Paul Arnoldi
- Fred Astaire
- Burt Bacharach
- Kenny Ball
- Kenny Ballard
- Gilbert Bécaud
- Budgie
- Maybelle Carter
- Change
- Cher
- The Critters
- Johnny Cymbal
- The D-Men
- Bill Dana (a.k.a. José Jiménez)
- Anita Darian, 1960, a self-titled album, Anita Darian (later titled East of the Sun), KL-1168
- El Chicano
- Dean Elliott
- Shirley Ellis (Congress)
- Jerry Fielding
- The Fireballs
- The Flying Machine (Congress)
- The Fortune Tellers (Robert Maxwell (songwriter)) (Medallion)
- The Four Lads
- Sergio Franchi (Four Corners)
- Frank Gallop
- The Ginger Snaps (including Judi Weiner)
- Tom Glazer
- The Greenwood County Singers (including Van Dyke Parks)
- Françoise Hardy (Four Corners)
- Joe Harnell
- Bill Hayes
- The Hesitations
- Gregory Howard and group
- Brian Hyland (Leader & Kapp)
- Elton John (two singles on Congress)
- Jack Jones
- Jimmy Justice (musician)
- Jerry Keller
- Just Us
- The Kids Next Door (Four Corners)
- Pete King Chorale
- Eartha Kitt
- The Latin Souls
- Raymond Lefèvre (Four Corners)
- Charles Lloyd
- Miriam Makeba
- Sam Makia and the Makapuu Beach Boys
- Jo Mapes
- Rod McKuen
- Carmen McRae
- David McWilliams
- Chad Mitchell Trio
- Art Mooney
- Jane Morgan
- Billy Mure (Tough Strings, KL-1253)
- The Nightcrawlers
- Linda Perhacs
- Leroy Pullins
- Pat Rolle
- Patty Lace & the Petticoats
- David Rose
- Ruby & the Romantics
- The Searchers
- Kermit Schaefer
- Linda Scott
- Harry Simeone Chorale
- Cal Smith
- Silver Apples
- Sonny & Cher
- Sugar & Spice
- Sundance
- Sylvia Telles
- Thee Prophets
- Good Rats
- The Three of Us
- Mel Tillis
- The Trophies
- The Unifics
- Billy Usselton
- Leroy Van Dyke
- Lenny Welch
- Billy Edd Wheeler
- Roger Williams
- Bob Wills
- Ruby Wright
- The "You Know Who" Group (Four Corners)
