= Maurice Tandy =

Irish cricketer, surveyor and soldier

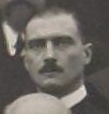
- Maurice Tandy in 1913

Personal information
- Full name: Maurice O'Connor Tandy
- Born: 17 November 1873; Loodianah, Punjab Province, British India
- Died: 18 April 1942 (aged 68); Oxford, Oxfordshire, England
- Batting: Unknown
- Relatives: Ernest Tandy (brother)

Domestic team information
- Years: Team
- 1900/01: Europeans

Career statistics
Competition	First-class
Matches	1
Runs scored	65
Batting average	65.00
100s/50s	–/1
Top score	64*
Catches/stumpings	1/–
- Source: ESPNcricinfo, 13 November 2023

Maurice O'Connor Tandy OBE DSO (17 November 1873 – 18 April 1942) was an Irish first-class cricketer and British Army officer. He was best known for his 28-year service with the Survey of India, in which he served as a director from 1926 to 1928, on his retirement he was Director of the Geodetic Branch at Dehra Dun.

== Early life ==
The son of Edward Ord Tandy, he was born in British India at Loodianah. His elder brother was Edward Aldborough Tandy (who was Surveyor General of India from 1924–1928), his younger brother was Ernest Tandy (who also served in the British Army and became a first-class cricketer). They were descended from James Napper Tandy, an Irish revolutionary and a founder of the United Irishmen. Tandy was educated in England at Tonbridge School, before attending the Royal Military Academy, Woolwich, where he had the distinction of winning the double bugle whilst a cadet. He graduated from there into the Royal Engineers (RE) as a second lieutenant in July 1893.

== Military and surveying career ==
Tandy was posted to British India in the Military Works Department in October 1893. He was promoted to lieutenant in July 1896, prior to being appointed as an assistant-superintendent in the Survey of India (SoI) in January 1900. Later in 1900, he made a single appearance in first-class cricket for the Europeans cricket team against the Parsees at Poona in the 1900–01 Bombay Presidency Match. Batting twice in the match, he was dismissed for a single run in the Europeans first innings by Maneksha Bulsara, while in their second innings he scored an unbeaten 64 runs batting at number eleven, sharing in a 114 runs stand for the tenth wicket with William Drysdale. Tandy served in the Aden Protectorate in 1903 and 1904, and was appointed to be a deputy-superintendent in the SoI in March 1910. Three years later, in July 1913, he was promoted to major.

Tandy served with the REs during the First World War, being wounded in action at the Battle of Loos in 1915. Following his recovery, he was employed with tanks and went to Mesopotamian in 1916. It was for his service in the Mesopotamian campaign that he was awarded the Distinguished Service Order (DSO) in February 1918 and mentioned in dispatches; his two brothers also received the DSO during the war. A month prior to the end of the war, he was appointed an acting lieutenant colonel, later relinquishing the rank following the war, in April 1919. He was made an OBE in the 1919 Birthday Honours, and shortly after served in the Third Anglo-Afghan War from May to August 1919, during which he was mentioned in dispatches. He was promoted to lieutenant colonel in January 1921, with his appointment to superintendent in the SoI following in October 1924. Two years later, he was appointed as a director, initially as Director of Frontier Surveys. He was promoted to lieutenant colonel in January 1921 and to colonel in December 1927. Tandy retired from the RE and the SoI in December 1928, at which point he was granted the honorary rank of brigadier.

Upon his return to the United Kingdom, he became an instructor of surveying at Worcester College at the University of Oxford for thirteen years. Tandy lived his final years in Oxford at his residence on the Banbury Road, where he died following a short illness in April 1942.
