= Edward Aldborough Tandy =

Irish surveyor and soldier

Brigadier E.A. Tandy Kt

Surveyor General of India
- In office 1924–1928
- Preceded by: Charles Henry Dudley Ryder
- Succeeded by: Robert Henry Thomas

Personal details
- Born: Edward Aldborough Tandy; 26 December 1871
- Died: 30 November 1950 (aged 78) Oxford

Sir Edward Aldborough Tandy (26 December 1871 – 30 November 1950) was a British Army officer who spent much of his career at the Survey of India and was Surveyor General of India 1924–1928. When he retired in 1928 he held the rank of Brigadier and he was created a Knight Bachelor in 1929.

He was the son of Colonel Edward Ord Tandy, Maurice Tandy (who also worked at the Survey of India) and Ernest Tandy were his younger brothers.

He served as a field engineer in the Tirah campaign and joined the Survey of India in 1898. During WW1 he spent a period in Mesopotamia and in 1921 he was appointed as a Director to the Survey of India and became Surveyor General in 1924.

Tandy died in Oxford on 30 November 1950.
