= Robert Ryder =

British naval officer (1908–1986)

Captain Robert Ryder VC
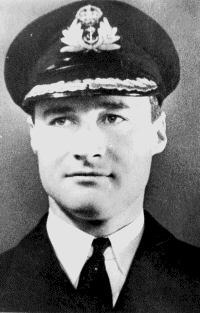

Member of Parliament for Merton and Morden
- In office 23 February 1950 – 6 May 1955
- Preceded by: Constituency created
- Succeeded by: Humphrey Atkins

Personal details
- Born: Robert Edward Dudley Ryder; 16 February 1908 British India
- Died: 29 June 1986 (aged 78) At sea off Guernsey
- Party: Conservative
- Relatives: See Ryder family

Military service
- Allegiance: United Kingdom
- Branch/service: Royal Navy
- Years of service: 1926–1950
- Rank: Captain
- Commands: HMS Opportune (1944–45); HMS Prince Philippe (1941); HMS Fleetwood (1940–41); HMS Edgehill ex Willamette Valley (1939–40)
- Battles/wars: Second World War; St Nazaire Raid; Dieppe Raid; Normandy landings
- Awards: Victoria Cross; Mentioned in Despatches (3); Polar Medal; Légion d'honneur (France); Croix de guerre (France)

Captain Robert Edward Dudley Ryder VC (16 February 1908 – 29 June 1986) was a Royal Navy officer and a British recipient of the Victoria Cross, the highest award for gallantry in the face of the enemy that can be awarded to British and Commonwealth forces. He became a Conservative Member of Parliament after retiring from the navy.

== Early life ==
Ryder was born in India in 1908 to Colonel Charles Henry Dudley Ryder, Surveyor General of India, and Ida Josephine Grigg. He was a great-grandson of the Right Reverend Henry Ryder, youngest son of Nathaniel Ryder, 1st Baron Harrowby. Ryder had two brothers; both were killed in the Second World War. Lisle Charles Dudley Ryder was killed in the Le Paradis massacre of 1940 in France. Ernle Terrick Dudley Ryder died in captivity after the defence of Singapore. Ryder was educated at Hazelhurst School and Cheltenham College before he entered the Royal Navy in 1926.

== Naval career ==
Ryder served on several ships throughout his career. He served as a midshipman on the battleship HMS Ramillies from 1927 to 1929. As a lieutenant he served in the submarine HMS Olympus as part of the 4th Flotilla in China from 1930 to 1933. Ryder also commanded several expeditions. This included captaining the ketch Tai-Mo-Shan on a 16,217 mile voyage from Hong Kong to Dartmouth, England during 1933–1934. Investigative work by the Times of London in 2007 found that the voyage was more than a great yachting exploit. The young naval officers were spying on Imperial Japanese Navy anchorages in the Kurile Islands to survey the isles for potential Allied submarine bases for an attack on the Japanese Navy. That same base in the Kurile Islands was later used for the attack on Pearl Harbor. The yacht Tai-Mo-Shan was resold and repaired numerous times and later reached a wider audience when she starred in the box office hit Mama Mia in 2008.

From 1934 to 1937 he captained the schooner Penola during the British Graham Land Expedition in Antarctica.

When the Second World War started, Ryder was serving as a lieutenant commander on HMS Warspite. In 1940, he was promoted to commander of the Q-ship HMS Edgehill which was sunk on the 29th of June 1940, torpedoed three times by German submarine U51 in the Atlantic, 200 miles west of Ireland; Ryder was adrift for four days before rescue by an off course convoy. After his recovery in hospital, he was appointed commander of the sloop HMS Fleetwood. In early 1941, he went on to captain the Prince Philippe a cross-channel steamer converted to a Commando ship, which sank after a collision in the Firth of Clyde. Ryder, now a commander, led the St Nazaire Raid, codenamed Operation Chariot, on 28 March 1942. This was a successful operation to destroy the "Normandie Dock" in the German naval base in the town. The stated aim of the operation was to deny large German ships, particularly the German battleship Tirpitz, a base on the Atlantic coast. For his actions during this operation he was one of five people awarded the Victoria Cross, the highest award for valour of the British Empire.

=== Victoria Cross ===
The official citation:

The KING has been graciously pleased to approve the award of the Victoria Cross for daring and valour in the attack on the German Naval Base at St. Nazaire, to:

Commander Robert Edward Dudley Ryder, Royal Navy.

For great gallantry in the attack on St Nazaire. He commanded a force of small unprotected ships in an attack on a heavily defended port and led H.M.S. Campbeltown in under intense fire from short range weapons at point blank range. Though the main object of the expedition had been accomplished in the beaching of Campbeltown, he remained on the spot conducting operations, evacuating men from Campbeltown and dealing with strong points and close range weapons while exposed to heavy fire for one hour and sixteen minutes, and did not withdraw till it was certain that his ship could be of no use in rescuing any of the Commando Troops who were still ashore. That his Motor Gun Boat, now full of dead and wounded, should have survived and should have been able to withdraw through an intense barrage of close range fire was almost a miracle.

His medal is held by the Imperial War Museum, London.

=== Later naval career ===
Ryder took part in the Allied attack on the German-occupied port of Dieppe, Seine-Inférieure on the northern coast of France on 19 August 1942. The Dieppe Raid was a failure, but it helped influence planning for Operation Overlord, the landings on D-Day. Ryder achieved a final rank of captain in 1948 and later served as naval attaché in Oslo.

== Personal life ==
Ryder married Constance Hilaré Myfanwy Green-Wilkinson on 26 April 1941 at St Pater's Church, Cranbourne. Hilaré's father (the Reverend Lumley Green-Wilkinson) was the Vicar of the parish of Ascot, and at one time had been the chaplain to the Archbishop of Canterbury. Robert and Hilaré were married by Cosmo Lang, the Archbishop of Canterbury.

The Ryders had two children - Lisle (b 1943) who also joined the Royal Navy, before being ordained priest in the Church of England, and eventually becoming a Canon of Worcester Cathedral - and Susan (b 1944). who became a successful portraitist and painter. In 1981 she was commissioned by the Prince of Wales to paint Princess Diana in her wedding dress.

== Later life ==
Following his naval career, he stood for election to the House of Commons as the Conservative Party candidate for Merton and Morden at the 1950 general election. He was elected and served as the Member of Parliament for five years. From 1955 to 1959 Ryder was Managing Director John Lewis Partnership. In 1962 Ryder was appointed to the management committee of the Royal National Lifeboat Institution (RNLI). He served until 1974, thereafter becoming a Life Vice-President.

In 1964 the Ryders retired to live in the Old Rectory at Wolferton, on the Queen’s Sandringham estate, in Norfolk. They were regularly guests of the Royal Family, and Robert occasionally joined shooting parties on the estate.

In 1977 the Ryders moved from Norfolk to Inkpen, near Newbury. Ryder’s wife Hilaré died on 19 September 1982. Ryder himself died on 29 June 1986, whilst on the yacht Watchdog during a sailing trip to France. He is buried in Headington Crematorium, Oxford.

== Awards ==
- Victoria Cross; gazetted 19 May 1942
- Légion d'honneur
- Croix de guerre
- 3 Mentions in despatches:
  - 2 October 1942
  - 10 November 1944
  - 15 December 1944
- Polar Medal with clasp

Parliament of the United Kingdom
New constituency	Member of Parliament for Merton and Morden; 1950–1955	Succeeded by Humphrey Atkins
