= Sidney Gerald Burrard =

British army officer (1860–1943)

Sir Sidney Gerald Burrard Bt KCSI FRS
- Burrard in c1923

Surveyor General of India
- In office 1911–1919
- Preceded by: Francis Becon Longe
- Succeeded by: Charles Henry Dudley Ryder

Personal details
- Born: Sidney Gerald Burrard; 12 August 1860 Isle of Wight, England
- Died: 16 March 1943 (aged 82) Farnborough, Hampshire, England
- Spouse(s): Gertrude Ellen Haig (m. 1887; died 1928) Alice Simons (m. 1935; died 1938)
- Children: Two
- Education: Uppingham School
- Profession: Engineer, army officer

Sir Sidney Gerald Burrard, 7th Baronet, KCSI, FRS (12 August 1860 – 16 March 1943) was a British army officer who served as Surveyor General of India and played a major role in the Great Trigonometrical Survey's work in the Himalayas and identified the source of errors resulting from the displacement of the plumbline by the gravitational attraction of the mountains.

== Early life ==
Burrard was born on the Isle of Wight in a family of eminence, his father being Lieutenant-Colonel Sidney Burrard of the Grenadier Guards. Their home at The Mount had been built by his grandfather, The Reverend Sir George Burrard. He was educated at school in Lymington and then Uppingham School from 1873 where he showed his mathematical talents. In 1874 he moved to Wellington College where again he excelled at mathematics which led his father to decide that he was suited for the Royal Engineers.

== Career ==
He received a commission in the Royal Engineers on 6 April 1879 and trained at the School of Military Engineering at Chatham. He sailed to India in 1882. He joined the Bengal Sappers and Miners at Roorkee and then joined the Zhob valley expedition in Baluchistan.

In 1884 he joined the Survey of India after a contemporary W.H. Pollen, who was posted as Aide-de-camp to the Viceroy, heard that there was a position for a young Royal Engineer who was good at mathematics and recommended Burrard's name to Lord Ripon. Burrard worked at Dehra Dun under J.B.N. Hennessey and C.T. Haig. Working with Heaviside and Strahan, he examined the causes of minute triangulation errors. These they determined by experiments as being caused by the attraction of the plumbline to the Himalayan mountains. This was further analysed by John Henry Pratt.

In 1887 Burrard married Gertrude Ellen the daughter of the Superintendent of the Trigonometrical Survey, Major-General C.T. Haig. Burrard went on furlough in 1890 to England where his wife, an artist, spent time to study painting. During this time Burrard worked on a family genealogy.

Burrard later worked at a tidal observatory on the Red Sea. In 1899 he was appointed Superintendent of the Trigonometrical Survey and became a Surveyor General in 1908. He was made a Companion of the Order of the Star of India (CSI) in 1911, and promoted to Knight Commander of the Order of the Star of India (KCSI) in 1914. In 1913 he received the Victoria Medal from the Royal Geographical Society. Burrard helped to organized the Indian Science Congress.

He left India in 1919 and retired to Farnborough. Lady Burrard died in 1928.

He succeeded his cousin as the 7th baronet on 1933 and in 1935 he married Alice Simons but she died in 1938. He had a son and a daughter from his first marriage. The son, later Major Sir Gerald Burrard (1888 – 1965) was a specialist on firearms and was involved in the creation of the Firearms Act 1936.

Depressed and with a weakening eyesight, Burrard died in 1943.

Baronetage of Great Britain
Preceded by Harry Paul Burrard	Baronet (of Walhampton); 1933– 1943	Succeeded by Gerald Burrard
