= George Strahan (engineer) =

British military engineer (1839–1911)

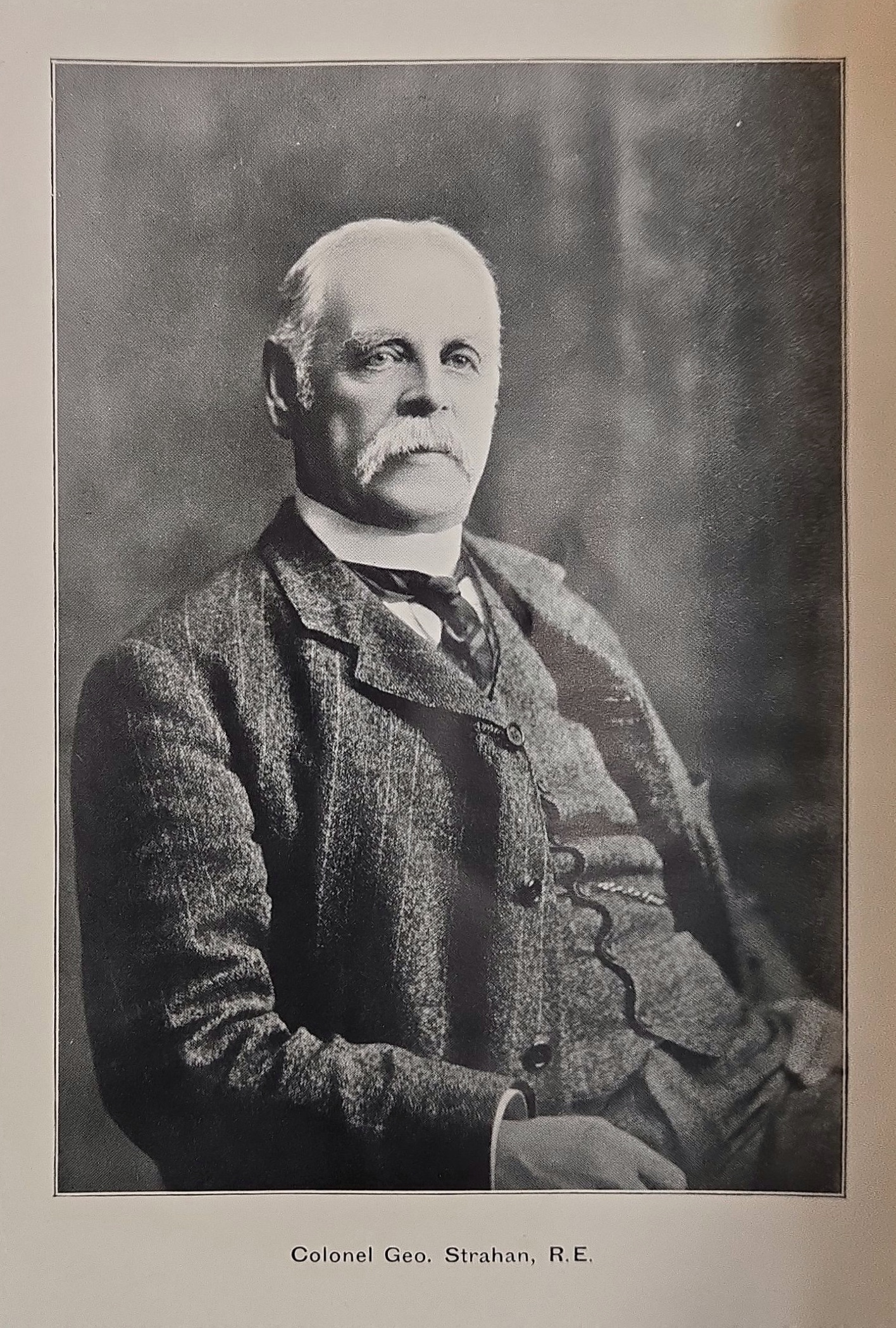

Colonel George Strahan (1839 – 7 January 1911) was a British army engineer who served in the survey of India and served as Superintendent of the Great Trigonometrical Survey from 1888 to 1894.

Strahan was born in Ashurst, Surrey to William Strahan. After studying at Eton he joined the Addiscombe college in 1857. At Addiscombe George showed abilities in mathematics and drawing. Among his brothers, William joined the army, Aubrey joined the Geological Survey in Britain, Henry became a mayor of Hythe and another brother Charles followed William into India in the Bengal Engineers. George went to India in 1860 to join the Bengal Sappers and Miners, Roorkee. He then served in surveying for the Ganges Canal and in 1862 he moved to the Survey of India. He worked in Central India initially followed by work in Rajasthan (Rajputana) in 1864 and then surveyed the Himalayas from 1866. From 1875 he worked with Mysore Survey. In 1881 he was moved to replace General W.M. Campbell in the geodetic surveys in the Nicobar Islands and in 1888 he became Superintendent of the Great Trigonometrical Survey. Strahan was involved in producing relief maps and because colour printing had not yet been introduced, he found photozincography unfit for his purpose. He retired in 1894 as Deputy Surveyor-General. He was a Fellow of the Royal Astronomical Society from 1869 and contributed notes on the comet of 1882, a meteor shower in 1885 and observed the eclipse of 22 January 1898 in Norway. Strahan designed sundials, one of which was placed in the Dehra Dun Survey Office. Strahan claimed that as a boy he had been influenced into landscape painting by a gift of John Ruskin's Modern Painters from his mother when he was just fifteen. He claimed that the book "taught me to see nature; all I know of nature and art I have learnt from it." He entered his paintings into the annual exhibitions in Shimla and won the Viceroy's prize three times. After retirement he lived for sometime in Dehra Dun but would travel to Kashmir in summer for climbs. He was also a violoncellist and was a member of the Philharmonic Society of Mussoorie. He died at Hampstead.

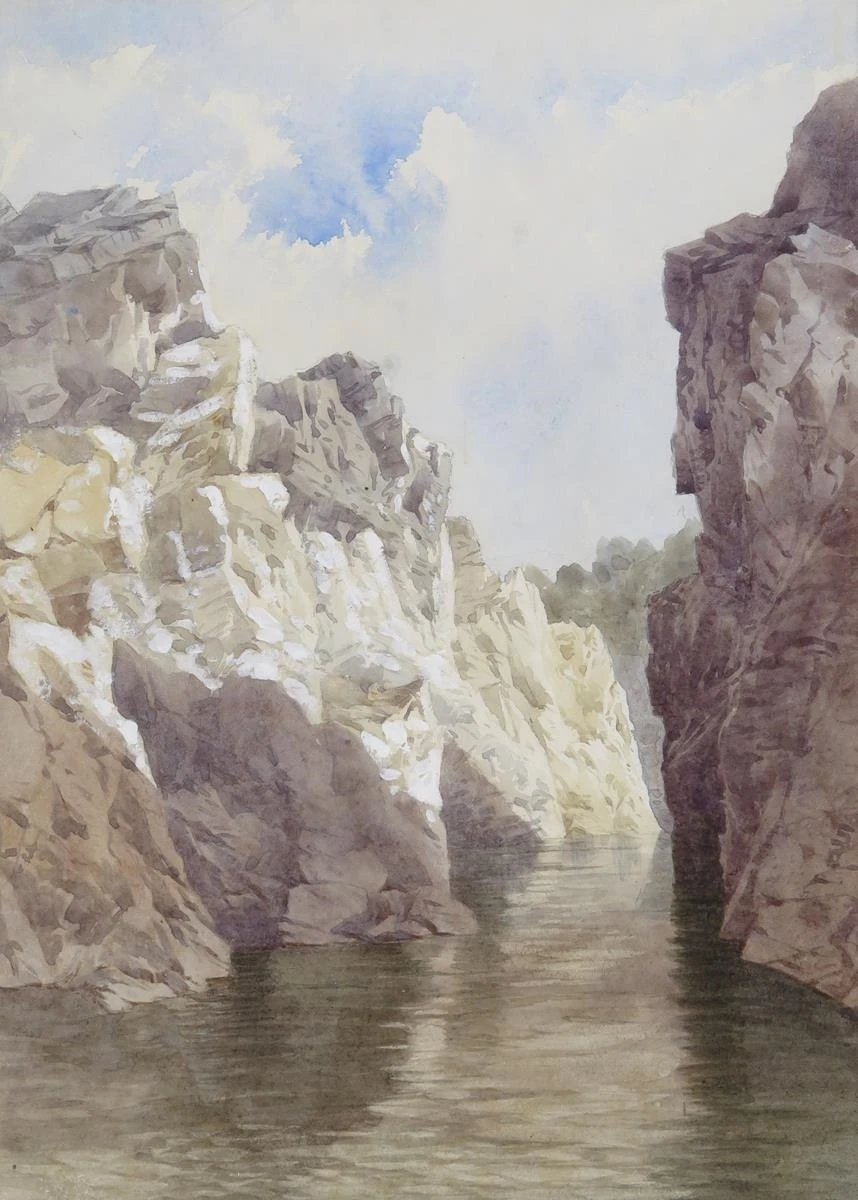
Marble rocks in Jabalpur, 1883

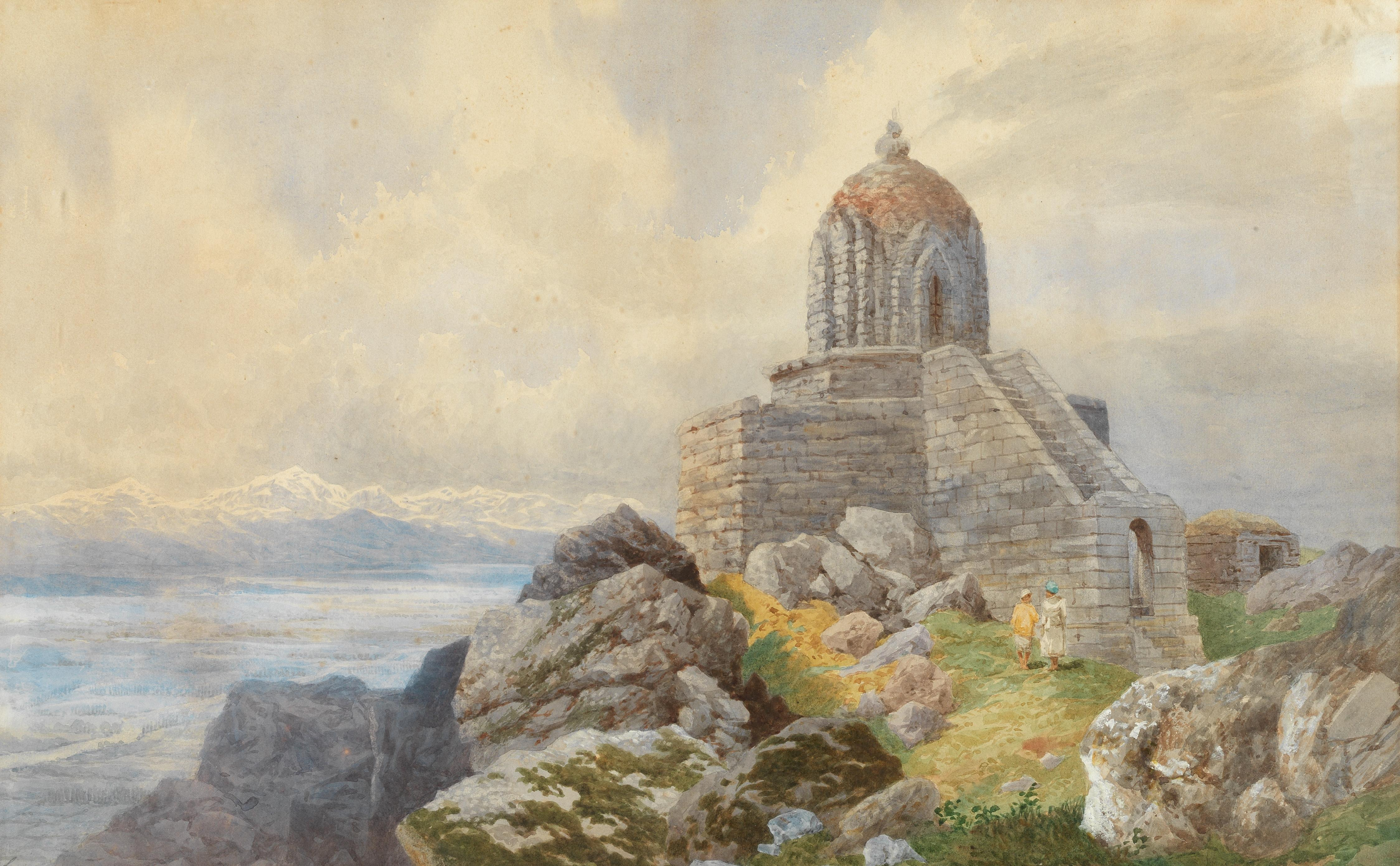
A mountain shrine in India

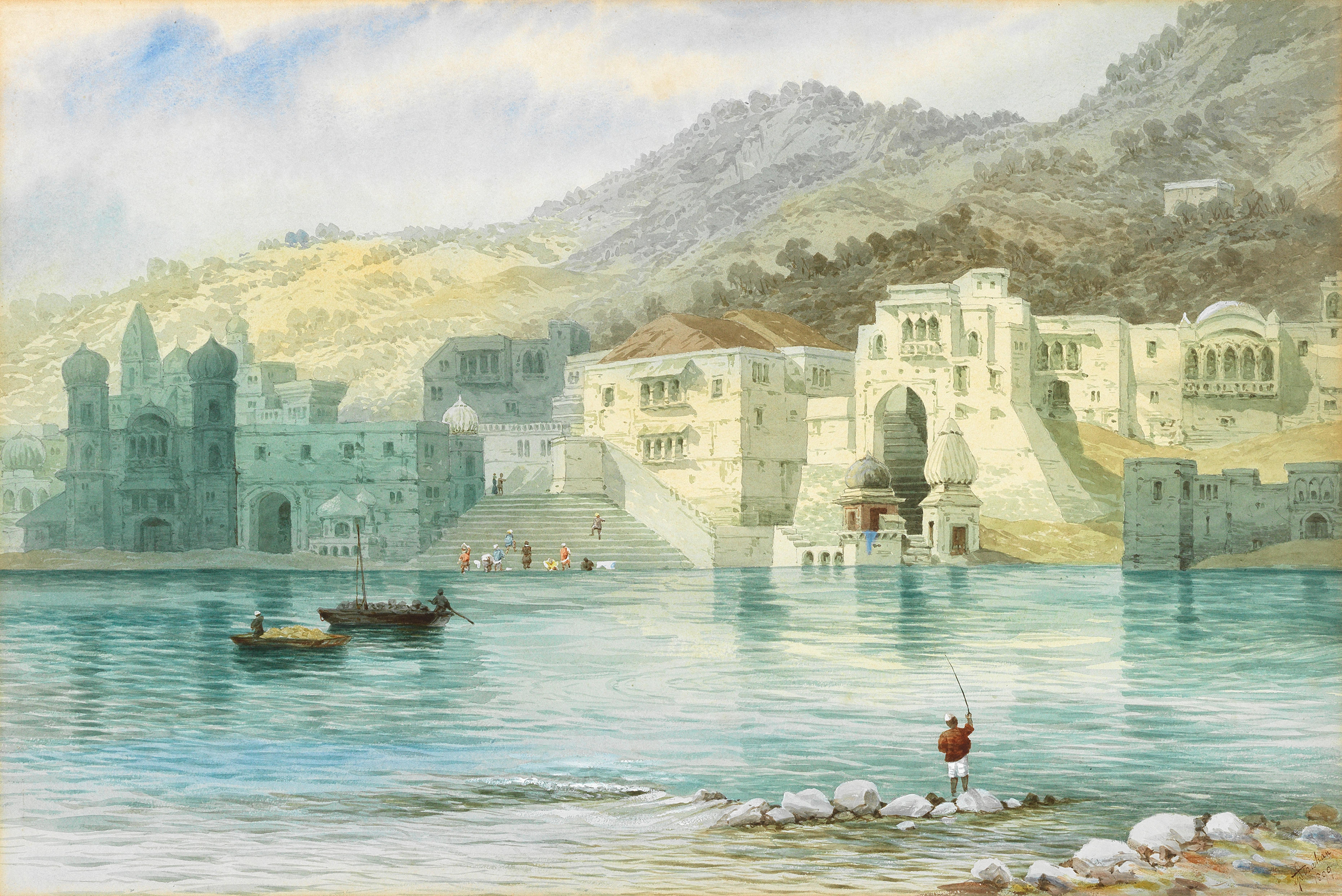
The sacred bathing ghat at Hardwar, 1899

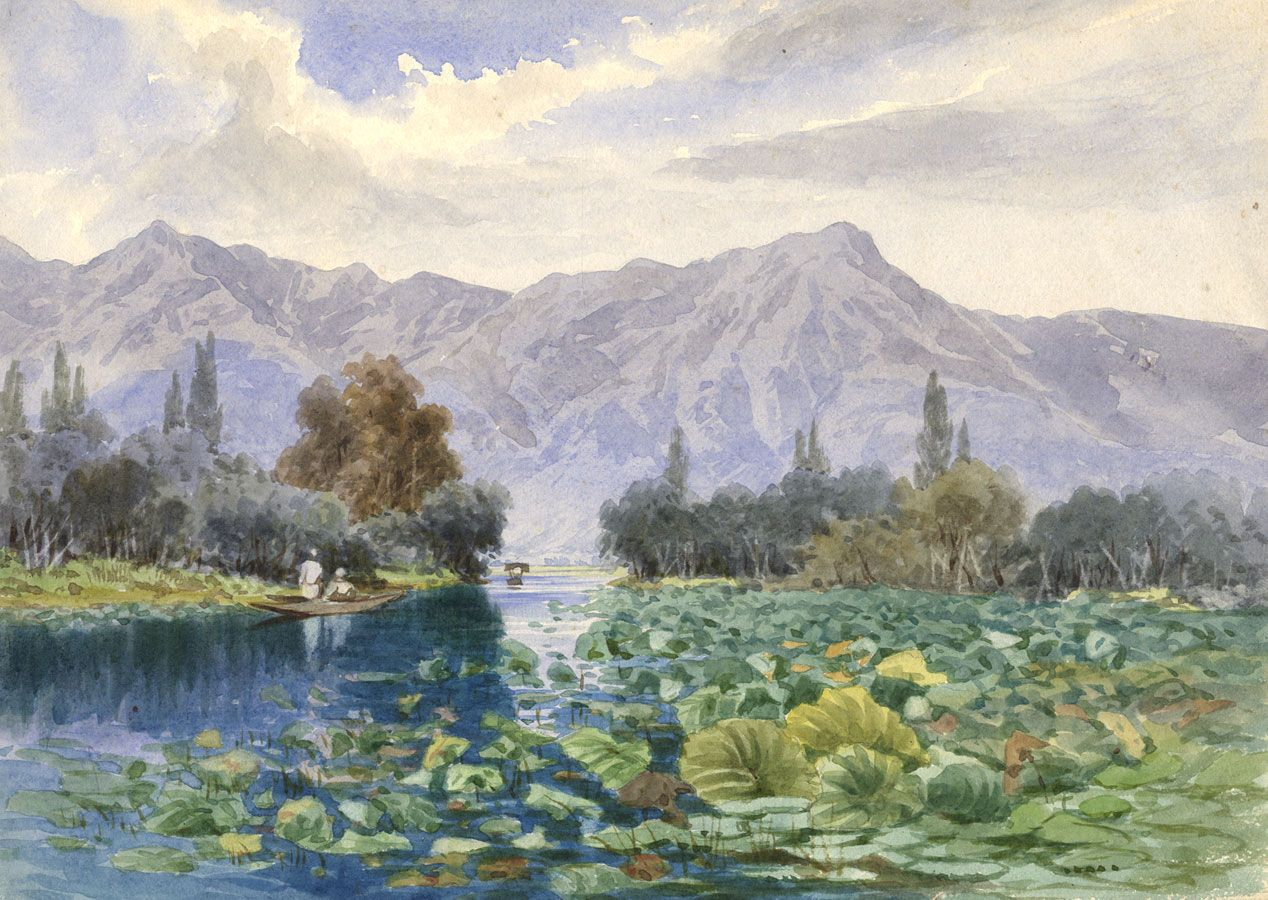
A watercolour of Dal Lake, 1902

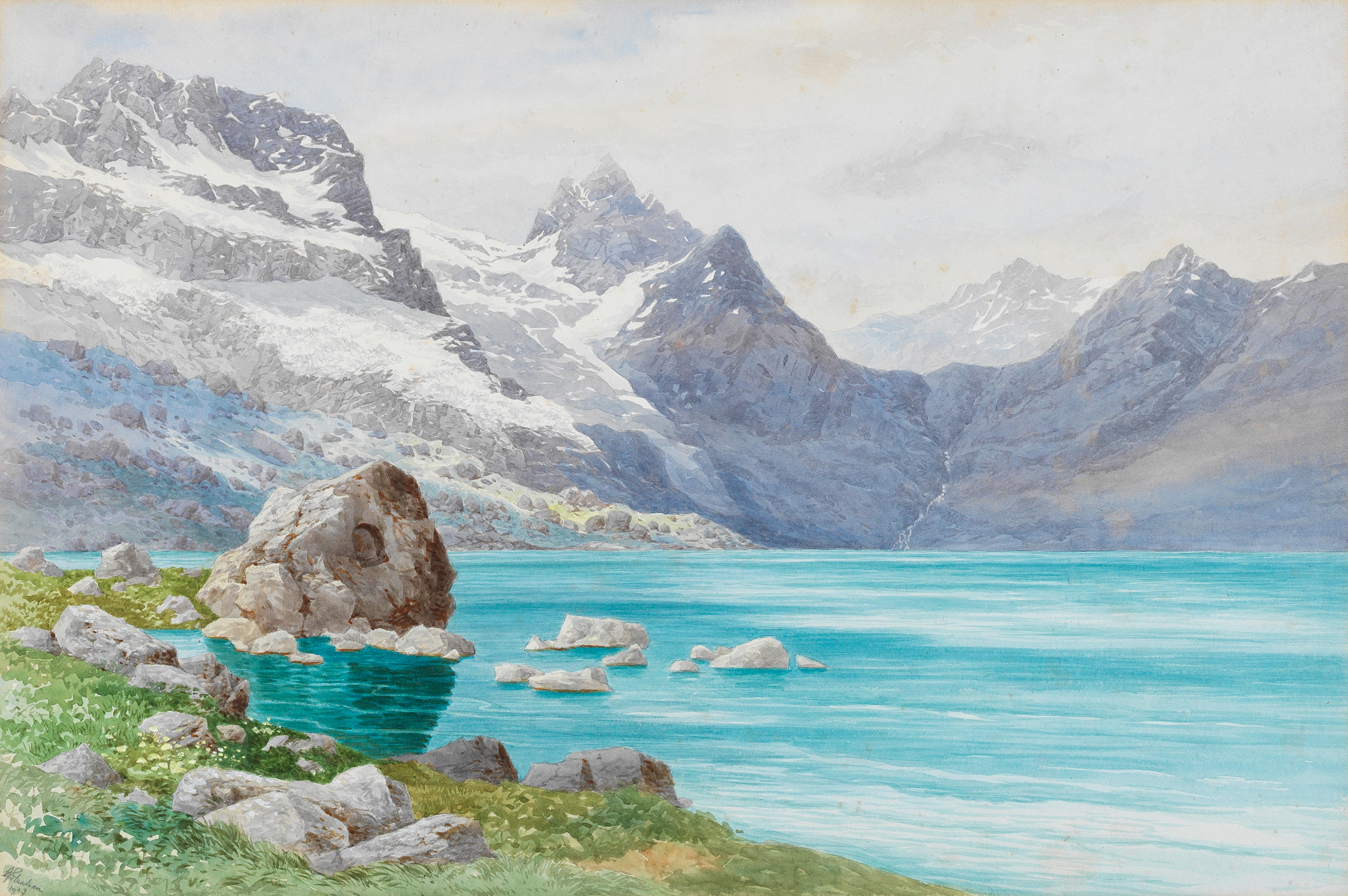
Gangabal Lake, 1903

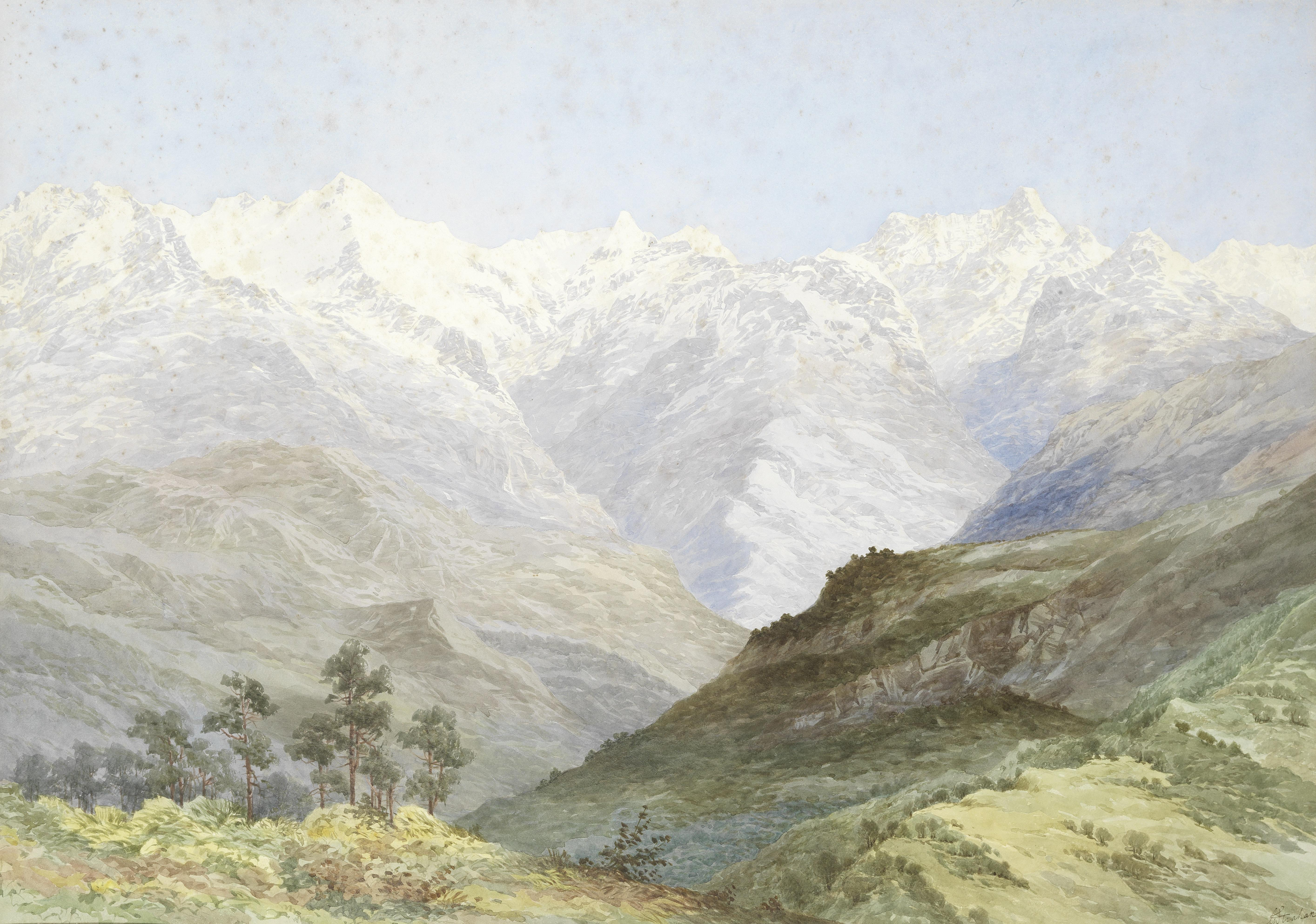
Kashmir
