= Great Trigonometrical Survey =

19th-century survey to measure the Indian subcontinent

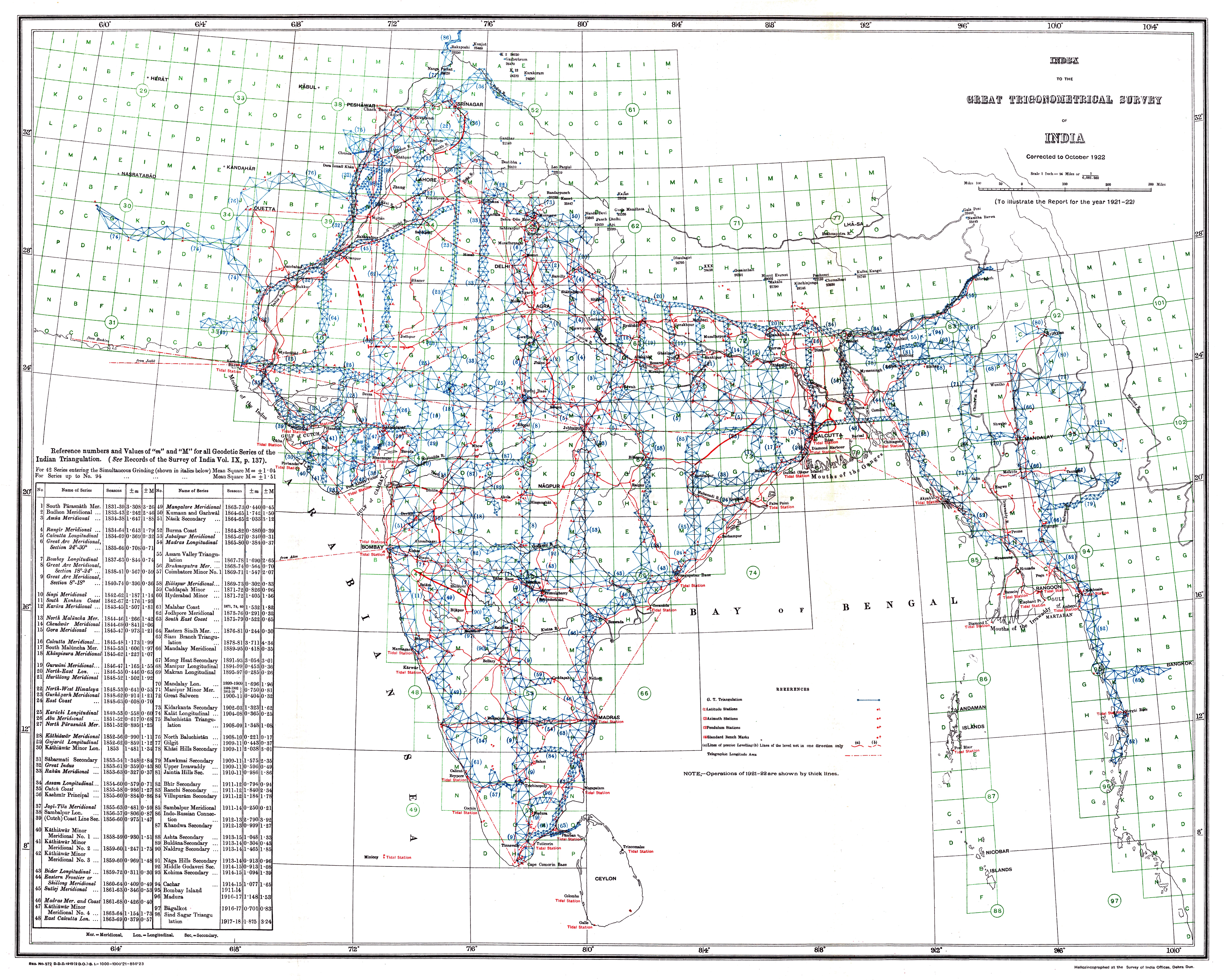
Index to the Great Trigonometrical Survey

The Great Trigonometrical Survey of India was a project that aimed to carry out a survey across the Indian subcontinent with scientific precision. It was begun in 1802 by the British infantry officer William Lambton, under the auspices of the East India Company. Under the leadership of his successor, George Everest, the project was made the responsibility of the Survey of India. Everest was succeeded by Andrew Scott Waugh, and after 1861, the project was led by James Walker, who oversaw its completion in 1871.

Among the many accomplishments of the Survey were the demarcation of the British territories in the subcontinent and the measurement of the height of the Himalayan giants: Everest, K2, and Kangchenjunga. The Survey had an enormous scientific impact as well. It was responsible for one of the first accurate measurements of a section of an arc of longitude, and for measurements of the geodesic anomaly, which led to the development of the theories of isostasy.

The native surveyors employed in the Himalayas, especially in Tibet (where Europeans were not allowed), were called pundits, and included the cousins Nain Singh Rawat and Kishen Singh Rawat.

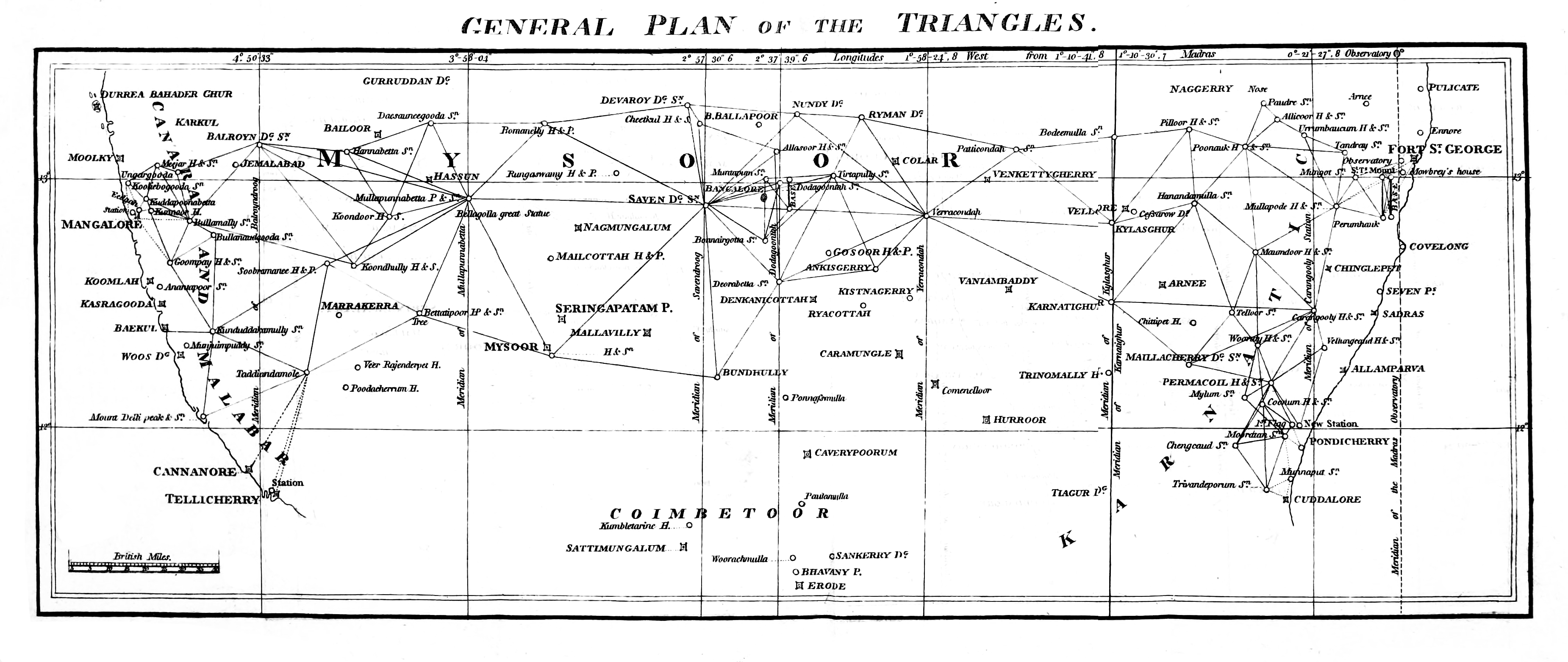
The first triangulations across the Peninsula

== History ==
From its inception in 1600 to its domination of the entire Indian subcontinent by the beginning of the nineteenth century, the British East India Company gained more and more territory. With the acquisition of new territory, it employed several explorers and cartographers to provide maps and other information on its territories, most notably James Rennell, from 1767 in Bengal. As Rennell proceeded to make maps, the lack of precise measurement was noticed. In 1800, shortly after the Company victory over Tipu Sultan, William Lambton, an infantry soldier with experience in surveying, proposed to remedy precisely that, through a series of triangulations, initially through the newly acquired territory of Mysore, and eventually across the entire subcontinent.

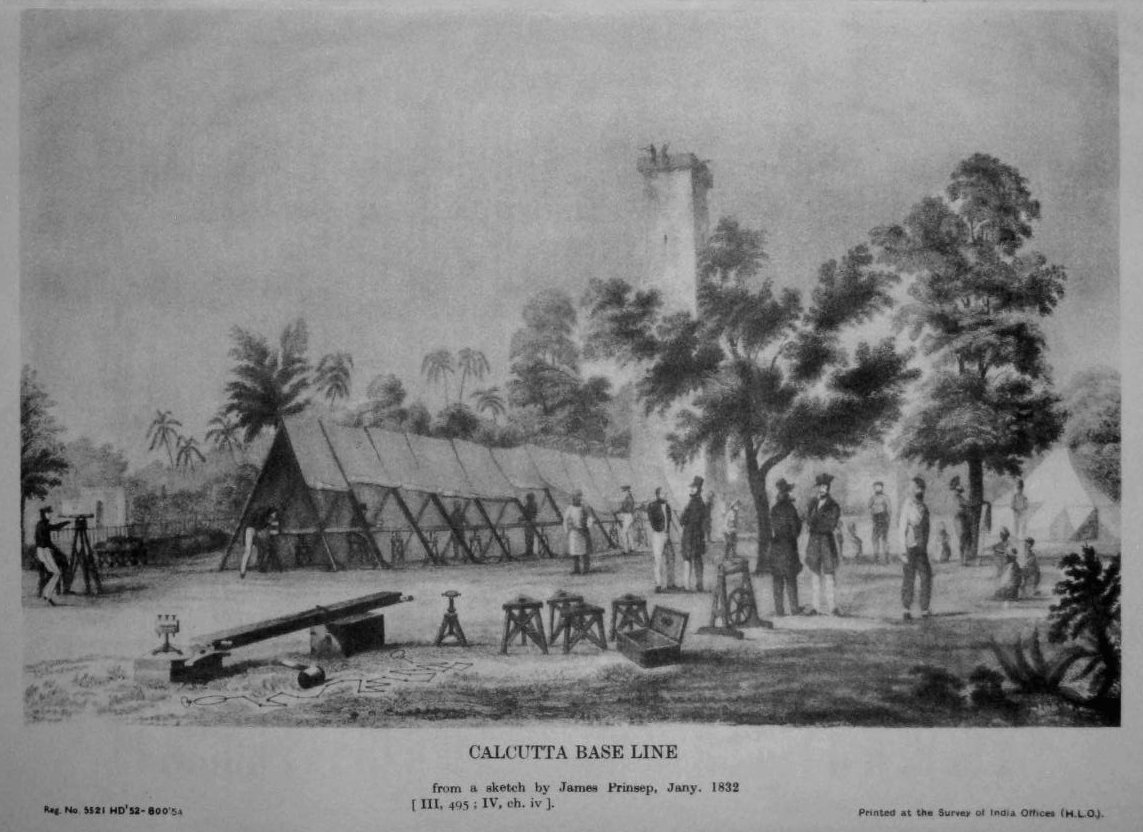
Measurement of the Calcutta baseline in 1832 based on a sketch by James Prinsep. This shows surveyors stretching a chain on coffers supported on pickets. The chain is housed under shade to reduce errors due to thermal expansion, and is aligned using a boning telescope. (Note: A boning telescope was a small, low-magnification telescope used to align the survey markers.)

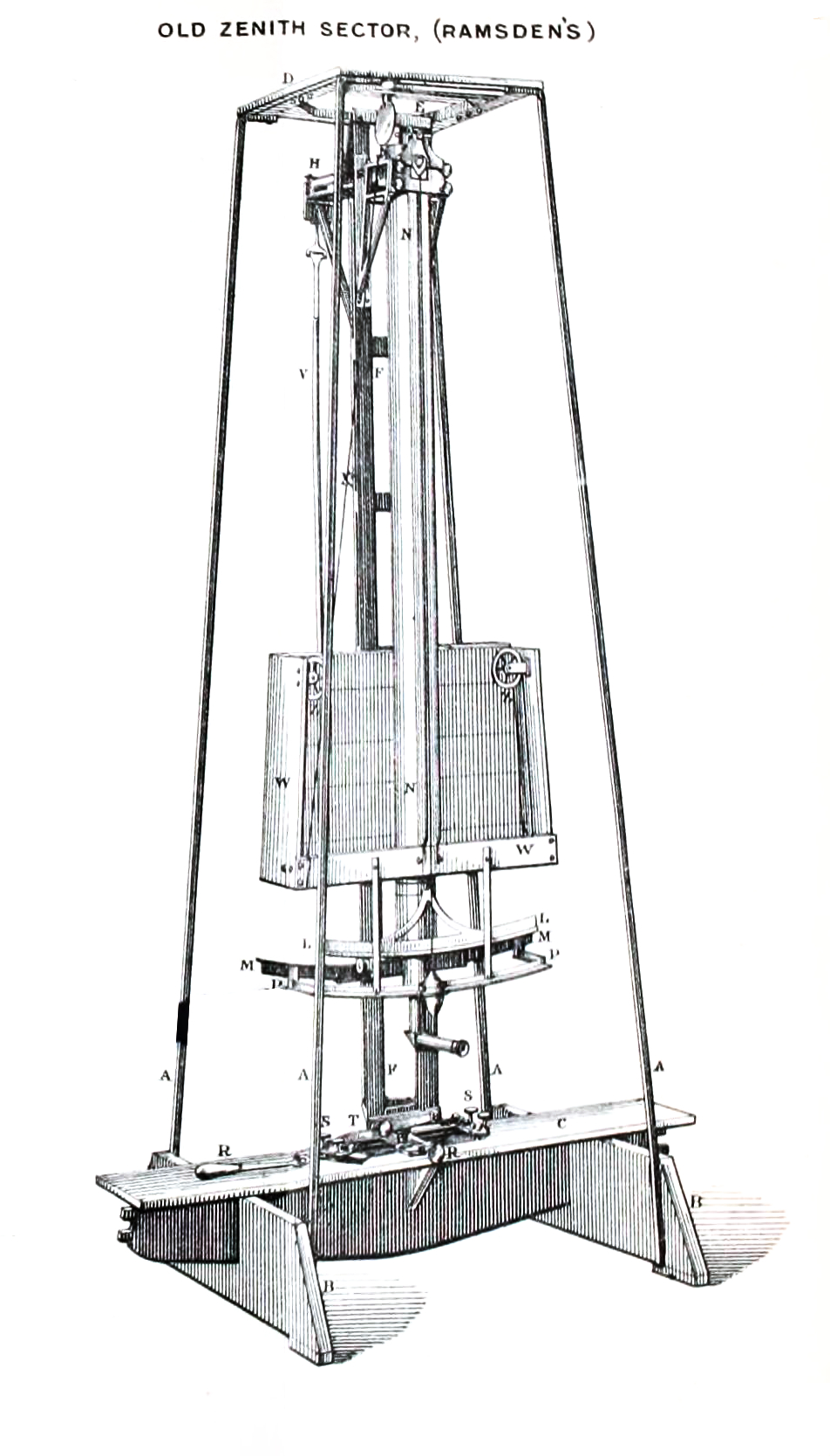
A zenith sector was an upward-facing telescope with accurate angle measurement scales. A star close to the zenith of known declination from the Pole Star was used to determine latitude, as a direct measurement of the Pole Star could be affected by refraction.

The Great Trigonometrical Survey of India started on 10 April 1802 with the measurement of a baseline near Madras. Major Lambton selected the flat plains with St. Thomas Mount at the north end and Perumbauk Hill at the southern end. The baseline was 7.5 miles (12.1 km) long. Lieutenant Kater was dispatched to find high vantage points on the hills of the west so that the coastal points of Tellicherry and Cannanore could be connected. The high hills chosen were Mount Delly and Tadiandamol. The distance from coast to coast was 360 miles (580 km), and this survey line was completed in 1806. The East India Company thought that this project would take about five years, but it took nearly 70 years, well past the Indian Rebellion of 1857 and the end of company rule in India. Because of the extent of the land to be surveyed, the surveyors did not triangulate the whole of India but instead created what they called a "gridiron" of triangulation chains running from north to south and east to west. At times the survey party numbered 700 people.

The Trigonometrical Survey was conducted independently of other surveys, notably the topographical and revenue surveys. In 1875, the decision was taken that the Survey budget should be reduced from 240,000 to 200,000 pounds. This resulted in a reorganization under Surveyor-General Colonel J.T. Walker to amalgamate the Great Trigonometrical, Topographical and Revenue Surveys into the Survey of India.

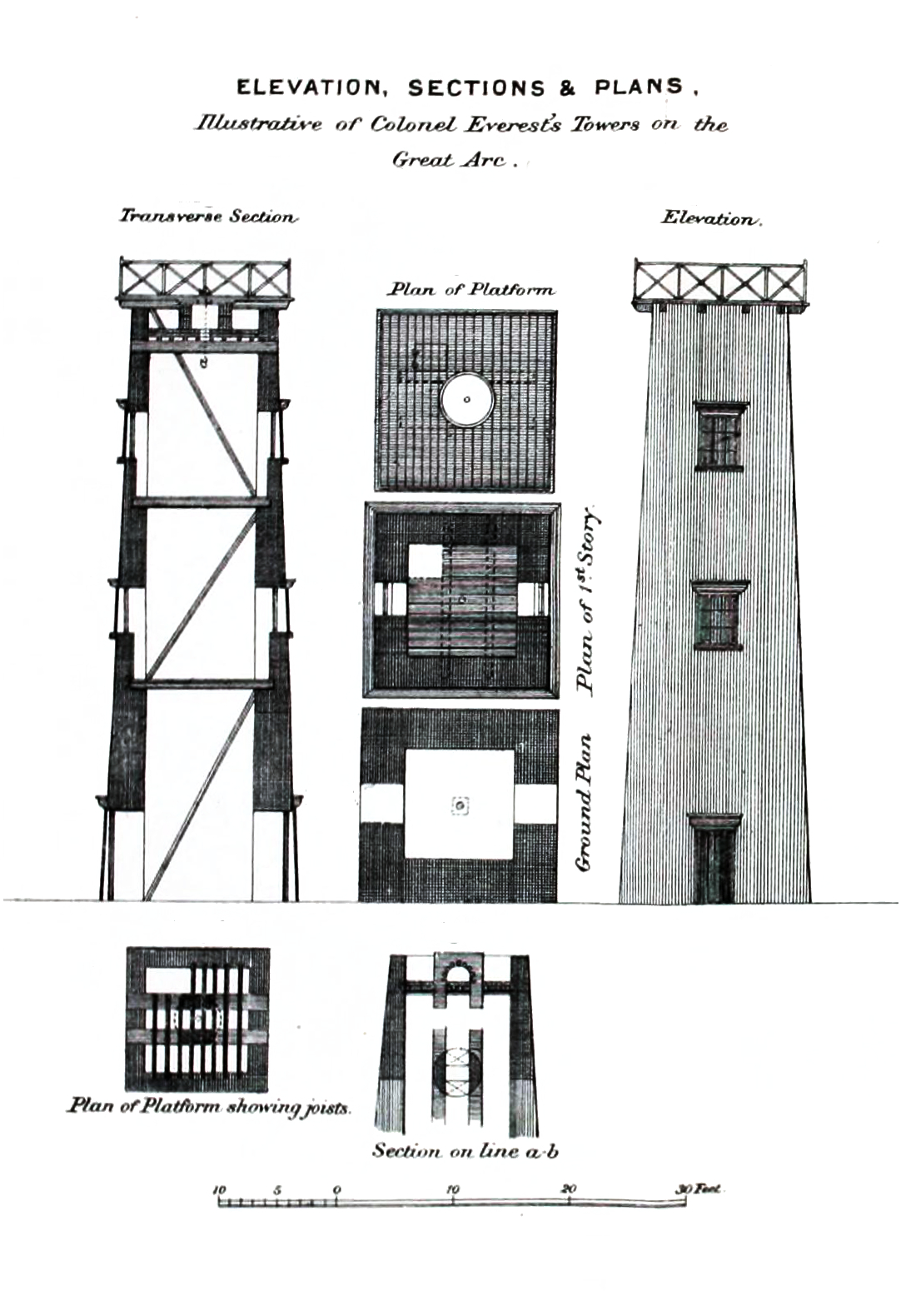
Survey towers used by George Everest to elevate the instruments

== Instruments and methods used ==
Triangulation surveys were based on a few carefully measured baselines and a series of angles. The initial baseline was measured with great care since the accuracy of the subsequent survey was critically dependent upon it. Various corrections were applied, principally temperature. An especially accurate folding chain was used, laid on horizontal tables, all shaded from the sun and with constant tension. The early surveys made use of large and bulky theodolites made by William Carey, a zenith sector made by Jesse Ramsden, and 100-foot (30 m) chains. Later surveys used more compact theodolites.

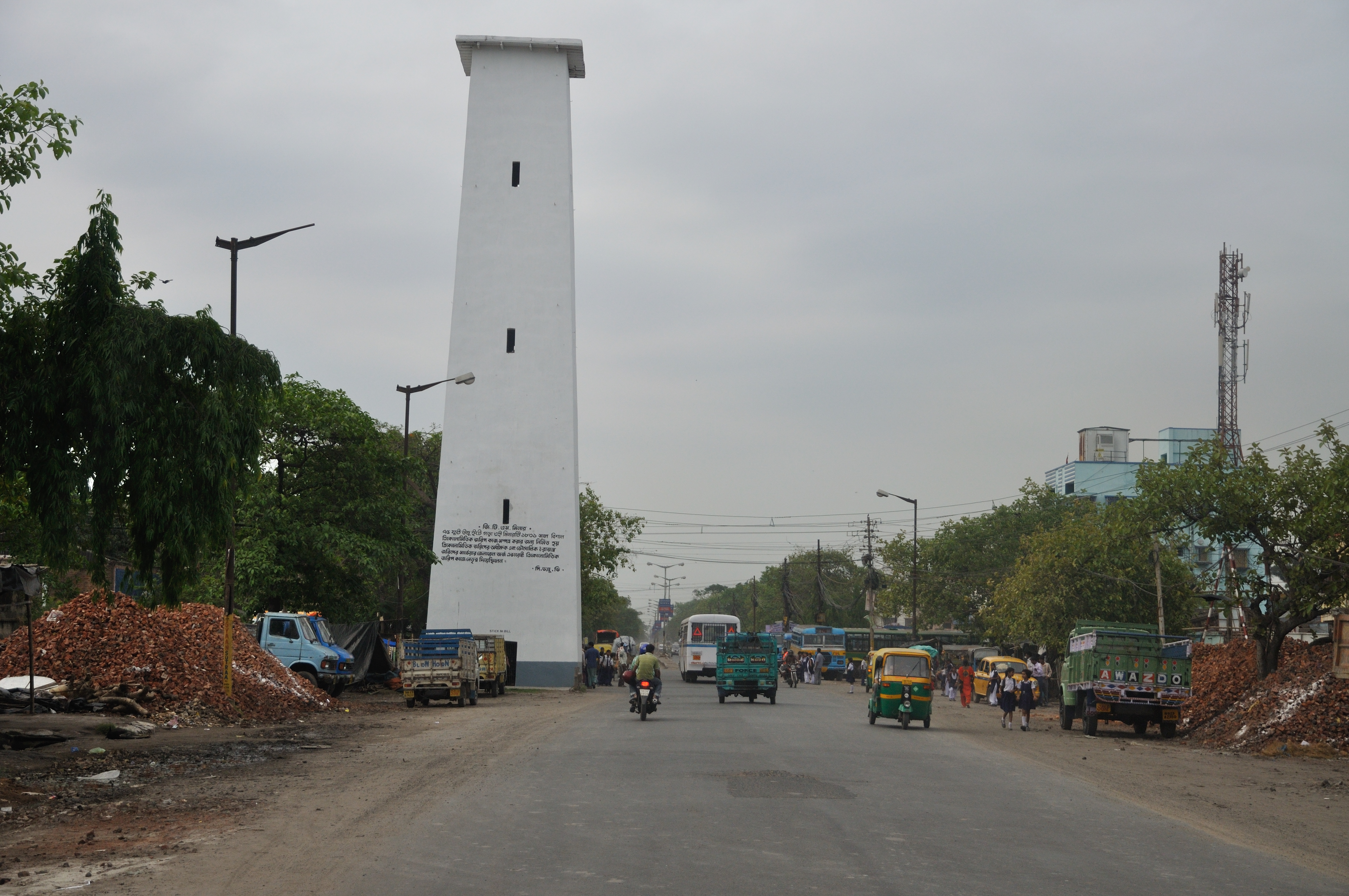
One of the survey towers in Kolkata in 2012

Accurate instruments could not always be purchased through the standard system of government contract, and Everest personally supervised the construction of instruments. He had a maker, Henry Barrow, set up an instrument company in Calcutta. Barrow was succeeded by Syed Mohsin from Arcot, Tamil Nadu, and after his death, the instruments were supplied by Cooke from York.

=== Correcting deviations ===
To achieve the highest accuracy, a number of corrections were applied to all distances calculated from simple trigonometry:

- Curvature of the Earth
- The non-spherical nature of the curvature of the Earth
- Gravitational influence of mountains on pendulums and plumb lines
- Refraction
- Height above mean sea level

== Superintendents ==
- 1818–1823 – William Lambton
- 1823–1843 – Sir George Everest
- 1843–1861 – Andrew Scott Waugh
- 1861–1883 – James Thomas Walker
- 1884–1888 – Charles Thomas Haig
- 1888–1894 – George Strahan
- 1894–1899 – St George Corbet Gore
- 1899–1911 – Sidney Gerald Burrard
- 1912–1921 – Sir Gerald Ponsonby Lenox-Conyngham

== See also ==
- Principal Triangulation of Great Britain
