= Dendrelaphis biloreatus =

Conservation status
- Least Concern (IUCN 3.1)

Scientific classification
- Kingdom: Animalia
- Phylum: Chordata
- Order: Squamata
- Suborder: Serpentes
- Family: Colubridae
- Subfamily: Ahaetuliinae
- Genus: Dendrelaphis
- Species: D. biloreatus

Binomial name
- Dendrelaphis biloreatus Wall, 1908

Synonyms
- Dendrelaphis biloreatus Wall, 1908; Dendrophis gorei Wall, 1910; Ahaetulla gorei — M.A. Smith, 1943; Dendrelaphis gorei — Das, 1996; Dendrelaphis biloreatus — Wallach et al., 2014

Species of snake

Dendrelaphis biloreatus (often called Gore's bronzeback or referred to as the Himalayan bronzeback) is a species of tree snake in the family Colubridae. The species is endemic to Asia.

== Geographic range ==
D. biloreatus can be found in parts of Northeast India (Darjeeling, Assam, and Arunachal Pradesh), northern Myanmar, and Western China (Tibet); it is also reported from Vietnam. (Note: Not included in the map in IUCN (2010); marked uncertain in the Reptile Database.)

== Habitat ==
The preferred natural habitats of D. biloreatus are forest and shrubland, but it has also been found in agricultural areas.

== Description ==
D. biloreatus is highly variable, typically non-venomous (some have enlarged rear fangs and toxic saliva) with large, regular scales on the head.

== Behavior ==
D. biloreatus is diurnal and fully arboreal.

== Reproduction ==
D. biloreatus is oviparous.

== Taxonomy ==
Dendrelaphis biloreatus was originally described by Wall in 1908 as a species new to science. In 1910 Wall described another new species, Dendrelaphis gorei. In 1943 M.A. Smith determined that Dendrelaphis biloreatus and Dendrophis gorei are the same species, which he placed in the genus Ahaetulla, as Ahaetulla gorei. Since then, this species has been referred to as both Dendrelaphis biloreatus and Dendrelaphis gorei. By precedence Dendrelaphis biloreatus is the correct scientific name, and Dendrelaphis gorei is a junior synonym.

== Etymology ==
The junior synonym Dendrelaphis gorei was named in honor of British army officer St. George Corbet Gore.
