= Merton and Morden (constituency) =

Parliamentary constituency in the United Kingdom, 1950–1974

- Former borough constituency for the House of Commons
- County: County of London

1950–1974
- Seats: One
- Created from: Wimbledon
- Replaced by: Mitcham & Morden

Merton and Morden was a parliamentary constituency in what was then the Merton and Morden Urban District in Surrey, but in major local government boundary changes in 1965 became part of the London Borough of Merton in Greater London. It returned one Member of Parliament (MP) to the House of Commons of the Parliament of the United Kingdom, elected by the first past the post system.

== History ==
The constituency was created for the 1950 general election from part of the Wimbledon constituency, and abolished for the February 1974 general election. It was replaced by the Mitcham and Morden constituency.

== Boundaries ==
The Urban District of Merton and Morden.

== Members of Parliament ==
Election	Member	Party
1950	Robert Ryder	Conservative
1955	Humphrey Atkins	Conservative
1970	Janet Fookes	Conservative
Feb 1974	constituency abolished	

== Election results ==
General election 1950: Merton and Morden
Party	Candidate	Votes	%	±%
Conservative	Robert Ryder	23,928	48.72	
Labour Co-op	Arthur Palmer	21,135	43.03	
Liberal	Roy Douglas	4,055	8.26	
Majority		2,793	5.69	
Turnout		49,118	88.11	
Conservative win (new seat)				

General election 1951: Merton and Morden
Party	Candidate	Votes	%	±%
Conservative	Robert Ryder	26,488	54.53	
Labour Co-op	Arthur Palmer	22,086	45.47	
Majority		4,402	9.06	
Turnout		48,574	86.66	
Conservative hold		Swing		

General election 1955: Merton and Morden
Party	Candidate	Votes	%	±%
Conservative	Humphrey Atkins	25,373	57.20	
Labour	Robert J Edwards	18,983	42.80	
Majority		6,390	14.40	
Turnout		44,356	81.64	
Conservative hold		Swing		

General election 1959: Merton and Morden
Party	Candidate	Votes	%	±%
Conservative	Humphrey Atkins	25,603	59.48	
Labour	Russell Kerr	17,440	40.52	
Majority		8,159	18.96	
Turnout		43,043	82.50	
Conservative hold		Swing		

General election 1964: Merton and Morden
Party	Candidate	Votes	%	±%
Conservative	Humphrey Atkins	19,032	46.37	
Labour	Kenneth W May	16,234	39.55	
Liberal	Nicholas D M McGeorge	5,781	14.08	New
Majority		2,798	6.82	
Turnout		41,047	82.33	
Conservative hold		Swing		

General election 1966: Merton and Morden
Party	Candidate	Votes	%	±%
Conservative	Humphrey Atkins	20,028	50.53	
Labour	Kenneth W May	19,608	49.47	
Majority		420	1.06	
Turnout		39,636	81.21	
Conservative hold		Swing		

General election 1970: Merton and Morden
Party	Candidate	Votes	%	±%
Conservative	Janet Fookes	18,727	50.82	
Labour	Kenneth W May	15,244	41.37	
Liberal	Richard Hallam Insoll	2,876	7.81	New
Majority		3,483	9.45	
Turnout		36,847	72.91	
Conservative hold		Swing		
