= Charles Thomas Haig =

British army officer (1834–1907)

Major-General Charles Thomas Haig (12 October 1834 – 29 June 1907) was a British army officer and surveyor who served as a superintendent of the Great Trigonometrical Survey in British India.

Haig was educated at Kensington Grammar School where he competed and won a cadetship offered by Sir Henry Willock who was a director of the East India Company. He joined the Military College at Addiscombe and graduated third in 1854 after W. Jeffreys and Clement M. Browne. He joined the Bombay Engineers on 8th June 1854. After studies at Chatham he arrived in Bombay in July 1856 and was posted at Poona. He was sent to the Persian Gulf in 1857 at the Battle of Khooshab under Sir James Outram. He returned to India and joined the Rajputana Field Force under General Roberts during the 1857 uprising and was present at the Siege of Kota in 1858. In September 1859 he joined the Great Trigonometrical Survey in the Kathiawar region. He was wounded at the Siege of Dwarka in December 1859. He took over triangulation work from 1860 to 1866 in western India. He developed special approaches to manage triangulation using chain surveys and plane tables in the flat and wooded regions of Gujarat lacking any landmarks to triangulate.

In 1864 he was aboard a steamer, the Lowjee Family, from Bombay to Surat and it sprung a leak. The captain had suggested that the English officers take the boat and leave the natives to their own means. Haig deposed the captain and took charge stating that either all would sink or swim together. He then allayed the panic, worked on pumping out the water and fixing the leak and took the steamer until the shore where all passengers were safely able to leave.

Haig was appointed commissioner at the International Congress of Geography held at Venice in 1881. He served as superintendent of the Great Trigonometrical Survey from 1884 to 1888. He retired in 1891.

Haig married Katherine, daughter of J. N. Walker, in 1864 and they had two daughters, one of whom married Sidney Gerald Burrard.
