= Charles Henry Dudley Ryder =

English army officer and explorer

C. H. D. Ryder CB CIE DSO

Surveyor General of India
- In office 1919–1924
- Preceded by: Sidney Gerald Burrard
- Succeeded by: Edward Aldborough Tandy

Personal details
- Born: Charles Henry Dudley Ryder; 28 June 1868
- Died: 13 July 1945 (aged 77)
- Spouse: Ida Josephine Grigg (m. 1892)
- Children: Six, including Robert Ryder VC

Colonel Charles Henry Dudley Ryder, CB, CIE, DSO (28 June 1868 – 13 July 1945) was an English army officer and explorer. An officer of the Royal Engineers, British Army, he served as Surveyor General of India from 1919 to 1924. During his career, he undertook a number of surveys; including in China's Yunnan province, Tibet and the Himalayas, the North-West Frontier Province, the Turco-Persian border, in Mesopotamia, and throughout India.

== Personal life ==
In 1892, Ryder married Ida Josephine Grigg (1872/3–1948). Together they had six children: three daughters were born in the 19th century and three sons were born in the 20th century. His two eldest sons were killed in action in the Second World War. His youngest son, Robert Ryder, was a Royal Navy officer who was awarded the Victoria Cross and later became a Member of Parliament.

== Honours ==
In 1905, he was awarded the Patron's Medal by the Royal Geographical Society "For his survey of Yunnan and his work in connection with the Tibet Mission". That same year, he was awarded the Distinguished Service Order (DSO) "in recognition of the services [...] with the Tibet Mission Escort".

In the 1915 King's Birthday Honours, Ryder was appointed a Companion of the Order of the Indian Empire (CIE) following his time in charge of the "Turco-Persian Frontier Commission, Survey Detachment". In the 1922 King's Birthday Honours, he was appointed a Companion of the Order of the Bath (CB).
