= James Walker (surveyor general) =

Anglo-Indian surveyor (1826–1896)

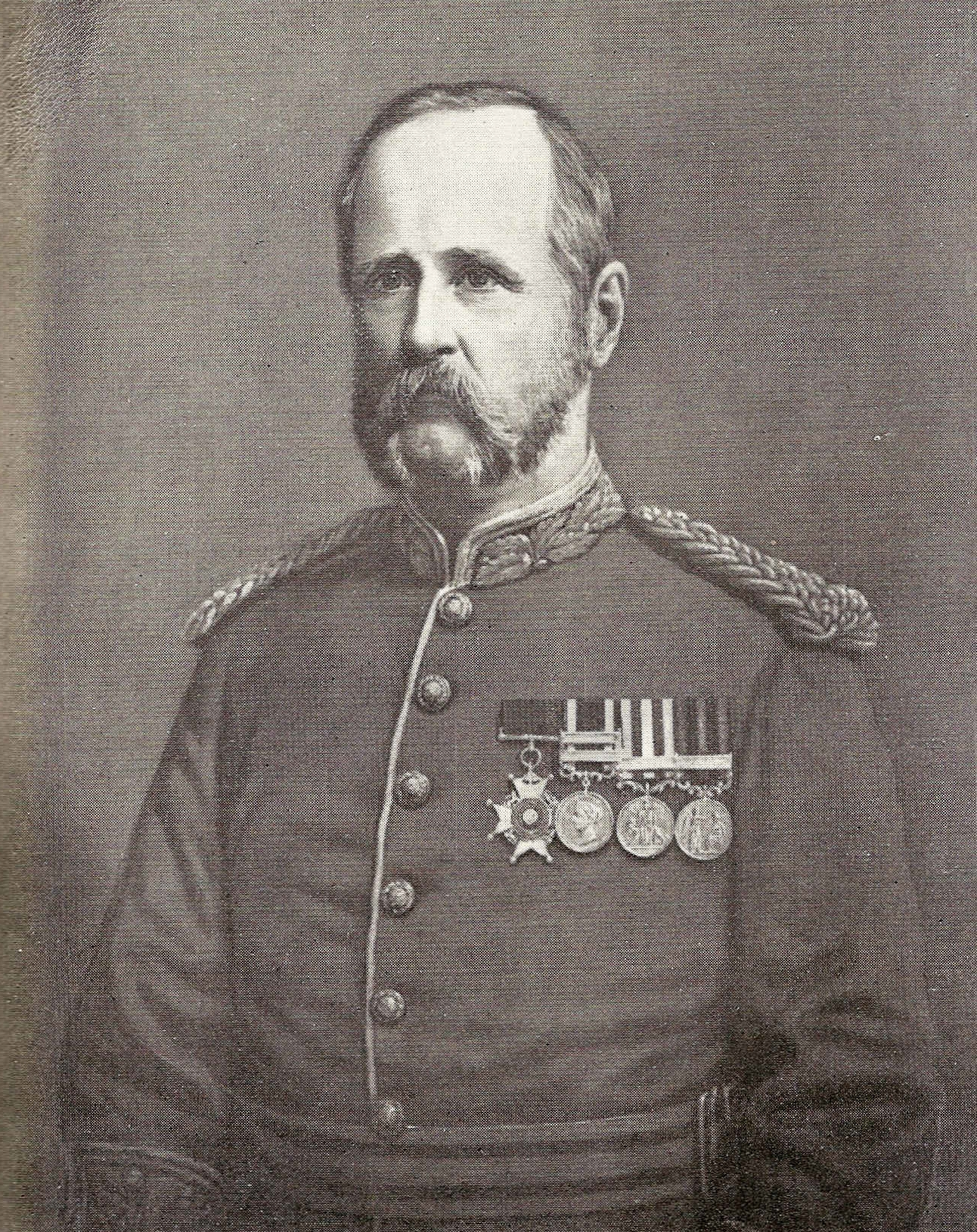

James Thomas Walker CB FRS (1 December 1826 – 16 February 1896) was an Anglo-Indian Surveyor General of India.

== Early life ==
Walker was born at Cannanore, India, the son of John Walker of the Madras civil service and educated privately in Wales and at the military college of the East India Company in Addiscombe, Surrey.

== Military career ==
In 1844 Walker was commissioned as a second lieutenant in the Bombay Engineers and in 1846 sent to Sindh, India as an executive engineer at Sakkar. In 1848 he was appointed an assistant field engineer in the Bombay column, under Brigadier-General Sir Henry Dundas, sent from Bombay to co-operate with Lord Gough's army in the Second Anglo-Sikh War. At the battle of Gujrat he was in command of a detachment of sappers attached to the Bombay horse artillery, and he took part under Sir Walter Gilbert in the pursuit of the Sikhs and Afghans.

After the subsequent annexation of the Punjab, he was employed from 1849 to 1853 in making a military reconnaissance of the northern-west frontier from Peshawar to Dera Ismail Khan. He took part at the end of 1849 in the attacks on Suggao, Pali, and Zarmandi under Colonel Bradshaw, and was mentioned in his despatches for the skill and ability with which he had bridged the rapid Kabul River. In 1850 he served under Sir Charles Napier in the expedition against the Afridis of the Kohat Pass, and in 1852 under Sir Colin Campbell in the operation against the Utman Khels, where his men bridged the swift Swat River. In 1853 he served under Colonel Boileau in his expedition against the Bori Afridis. On the completion of the military survey of the Peshawar frontier he was promoted to lieutenant.

On the outbreak of the Indian mutiny in 1857, Walker accompanied Brigadier-general (later Sir) Neville Chamberlain to Delhi, where he was appointed a field-engineer. On 14 July he was directed to blow in the gate of a serai occupied in force by the enemy, which he achieved by firing a musket into the attached gunpowder, exploding it and blowing in the gate, enabling the besiegers to charge in and rout the enemy. Walker himself was severely wounded by a bullet in the left thigh, and, whilst recovering from the wound, sustained an attack of cholera. He was promoted to captain in 1857.

When recovered he resumed work on the Indus survey, which was completed in 1860, and he was afterwards employed in the Jogi Tila meridional series. In 1860 he again served under Sir Neville Chamberlain in the expedition against the Mahsud Waziris, and was present at the attack of the Barara Tanai.

== Great Trigonometrical Survey ==
In 1860 he was appointed astronomical assistant and, on 12 March 1861, superintendent of the Great Trigonometrical Survey of India. In the next two years the three last meridional series in the north of India were completed, and Walker's first independent work was the measurement of the Vizagapatam base-line, which was completed in 1862. The accuracy achieved was such that the difference between the measured length and the length computed from triangles, commencing 480 miles away at the Calcutta base-line and passing through dense jungles, was but half an inch. He next undertook a revision of Lambton's triangulation in the south of India, with remeasurements of the base-lines. He was promoted to lieutenant-colonel in 1864.

On 1877 Walker was made a Companion of the Bath. On 1 January 1878 he was appointed Surveyor General of India, retaining the office of superintendent of the great trigonometrical survey. Later that year he was promoted to be major-general, and in 1881 to lieutenant-general. He retired from the service in 1883, and received the honorary rank of general in 1884.

== Honours and awards ==
Walker was elected a fellow of the Royal Geographical Society in 1859, and in 1885 was elected a member of its council. He was elected a fellow of the Royal Society in 1865, was made a member of the Russian Geographical Society in 1868, and of the French in 1887. In June 1883 he was made an honorary LL.D. of Cambridge University.

== Works ==
In 1895 he took charge of the geodetic work of the international geographical congress at the Imperial Institute in London. In May of that year he contributed a valuable paper to the Philosophical Transactions of the Royal Society (vol. clxxxvi.) titled "India's Contribution to Geodesy." Walker contributed to the Encyclopædia Britannica (9th edit.) articles on the Oxus, Persia, pontoons, and surveying. He also contributed to the Journal of the Asiatic Society of Bengal, the Transactions of the Royal Society, and the Royal Geographical Society's Journal.

== Personal ==
He had married Alicia, daughter of General Sir John Scott, in India, on 27 April 1854, with whom he had four children.

He died at his home in Cromwell Road, London on 16 February 1896, and was buried in Brompton Cemetery.
