= St George Corbet Gore =

Colonel St George Corbet Gore, CSI (24 February 1849 – 1913) was an English army officer and Surveyor General of India from 1899 to 1904.

Gore was born on 24 February 1849, the son of Rev. William Francis Gore, a male-line descendant of the Gore baronets of Megherabegg, by his wife Elizabeth Carey Baldock. He was educated at Lancing College before being gazetted as lieutenant in the Royal Engineers in 1870.

Gore arrived in British India in November 1872, and from March 1873 served on the great trigonometrical survey of India. Serving with distinction through the Second Anglo-Afghan War (1878–1880), he was officer in charge of survey during the march of Sir Donald Stewart's column from Kandahar to Kabul, and was mentioned in dispatches following the Battle of Ahmed Khel (19 April 1880). From 1884 he was attached to the Afghan boundary commission, and he was appointed deputy superintendent in 1886, and superintendent of trigonometrical surveys in Dehradun in May 1894.

He was appointed Surveyor General of India in October 1899, and retired in May 1904. For his service, he was appointed a Companion of the Order of the Star of India in the 1903 New Year Honours.

Gore was married to Elizabeth Julia Mackinnon Bruce, who died in Bombay on 23 October 1902.

Gore is commemorated in the scientific name of a species of Asian snake, Dendrelaphis gorei, which is a junior synonym of Dendrelaphis biloreatus.
