= George Everest =

British surveyor and geographer (1790–1866)

Sir George Everest KCB FRS FRAS FRGS
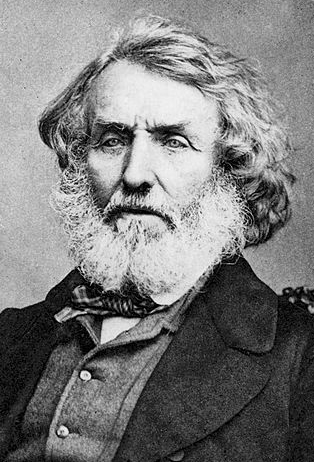
- Born: 4 July 1790; Crickhowell, Wales, or Greenwich, England
- Died: 1 December 1866 (aged 76); London, England
- Known for: Great Trigonometric Survey of India; Being the eponym of Mount Everest
- Awards: Medal of the Royal Astronomical Society (1847)
- Scientific career
- Fields: Geography

Sir George Everest (/ˈiːvrɪst/, EEV-rist; 4 July 1790 – 1 December 1866) was a British surveyor and geographer who served as Surveyor General of India from 1830 to 1843.

After a military education, Everest joined the East India Company and arrived in India at the age of 16. He was eventually made an assistant to William Lambton on the Great Trigonometric Survey, and replaced Lambton as superintendent of the survey in 1823. Everest was largely responsible for surveying the meridian arc from the southernmost point of India north to Nepal, a distance of about 2,400 kilometres (1,500 mi), a task that took from 1806 to 1841 to complete. He was made Surveyor General of India in 1830, retiring in 1843 and returning to England.

In 1865, the Royal Geographical Society renamed Peak XV—at the time only recently identified as the world's highest peak—to Mount Everest in his honour. Andrew Scott Waugh, his protégé and successor as surveyor general, had been responsible for putting his name forward in 1856. Everest's name was used as a compromise due to the difficulty of choosing between multiple local names for the mountain. He initially objected to the honour, as he had had nothing to do with its discovery and believed his name was not easily written or pronounced in Hindi.

== Biography ==
Everest was born on 4 July 1790. His place of birth is uncertain and was not recorded on his baptismal certificate. The Oxford Dictionary of National Biography states that he was born in Greenwich, then in the county of Kent, England. The Welsh Academy Encyclopaedia of Wales records a birthplace of Crickhowell, Brecknockshire, Wales. He was baptised at St Alfege Church, Greenwich, on 27 January 1791. His family was English but also spent time at Gwernvale Manor, his family's estate near Crickhowell (now in Powys).

Everest was the eldest son and third of six children born to Lucetta Mary (née Smith) and William Tristram Everest. His father was a solicitor and justice of the peace, part of a "Greenwich family of long standing", and was successful enough to acquire the large estate in south Wales. His grandfather John Everest, the son of a butcher, was the first in the family to enter the legal profession. The Everest family in Greenwich can be traced at least as far back as the late 1600s, when Tristram Everest–John's great-grandfather–was a butcher in Church Street.

Everest was educated at the Royal Military College in Marlow, Buckinghamshire, followed by a year at the Royal Military Academy, Woolwich, the military engineers' and artillery training college. He joined the East India Company as a cadet in 1806 (before he had reached the required age of 16). He was commissioned as a second lieutenant in the Bengal Artillery, and sailed for India in the same year.

Everest was a Freemason and initiated on an unknown date in Neptune Lodge, Penang, under the authority of the United Grand Lodge of England. After returning to England, he joined Prince of Wales' Lodge, London, on 20 February 1829.

=== Early career in India ===
Little is known about Everest's earliest years in India, but when he first arrived in the country at 16 years old he showed a talent for mathematics and astronomy. He was seconded to Java in 1814, where Lieutenant-Governor Stamford Raffles appointed him to survey the island. Everest returned to Bengal in 1816, where he improved British knowledge of the Ganges and the Hooghly River. He later surveyed a semaphore line from Calcutta to Benares, covering approximately 400 miles (640 km). Everest's work came to the attention of Colonel William Lambton, the leader of the Great Trigonometrical Survey (GTS), who appointed him as his chief assistant. He joined Lambton at Hyderabad, India in 1818, where he was in the process of surveying a meridian arc northward from Cape Commorin. He was responsible for much of the fieldwork, but then in 1820 contracted malaria, necessitating a period of recovery spent at the Cape of Good Hope in South Africa. According to historian John Keay, Everest acquired his particular interest in lines of meridian from the location of his family home at Greenwich, England, where the Royal Observatory, the historical origin of the Prime Meridian, was situated.

Recovering from malaria, Everest returned to India in 1821. He succeeded Lambton as superintendent of the GTS upon Lambton's death in 1823, and during the following years extended his predecessor's efforts on the arc up to Sironj, in present-day Madhya Pradesh. Everest was prone to suffer from poor health, however, and the effects of a bout of fever and rheumatism left him half paralysed. He returned to England in 1825, where he spent the following five years recuperating. During that time, Everest was elected as a Fellow of the Royal Society in March 1827. While in England he took the opportunity to petition the Board of Directors of the East India Company for better equipment (to his own designs), more suited to conditions in India. He persuaded the Board to extend the Great Arc survey northwards, towards the Himalayas. By reviewing his and Lamdton's measurements of arc made while in India, he published new estimates of the ellipsoidal axes of the Earth. He frequently corresponded with Thomas Frederick Colby of the Ordnance Survey to keep himself informed of the latest survey methods.

He became acquainted with Indian thought, according to his niece Mary Boole:

My uncle, George Everest, was sent to India in 1806 at the age of sixteen. [...] the boy went out ignorant, un-spoiled and fresh. He made the acquaintance of a learned Brahman who taught him—not the details of his own ritual, as European missionaries do, but—the essential factor in all true religion, the secret of how man may hold communion with the Infinite Unknown.

It is very likely he introduced Indian thought to others as well:

Some time about 1825, he came to England for two or three years, and made a fast and lifelong friendship with Herschel and with Babbage, who was then quite young.(.) My uncle returned from India. He never interfered with anyone's religious beliefs or customs. But no one under his influence could continue to believe in anything in the Bible being specially sacred, except the two elements which it has in common with other sacred books: the knowledge of our relation to others and of man's power to hold direct converse with the unseen truth.

=== Surveyor General of India ===
In June 1830, Everest returned to India to continue his work on the GTS, and was simultaneously appointed Surveyor General of India. The arc from Cape Commorin to the northern border of British India was finally completed in 1841, under the supervision of Andrew Scott Waugh. To his dismay, much of his time was spent on administrative concerns, as well as combating criticism from home. The East India Company had provisionally appointed Thomas Jervis as Everest's successor, and Jervis subsequently delivered a series of lectures to the Royal Society on the perceived deficiencies of Everest's methods.

In response, Everest penned a series of open letters to Prince Augustus Frederick, Duke of Sussex, the society's president, in which he lambasted the society "for meddling in matters of which they know little". Jervis withdrew from consideration, and Everest successfully secured the appointment of his protégé Waugh as his successor. He resigned in November 1842 and his commission was formally revoked in December 1843, at which point he returned to England.

=== Later life ===
In London on 11 November 1846 Everest married Emma Wing, aged 23, of Hampstead, London. They had six children.

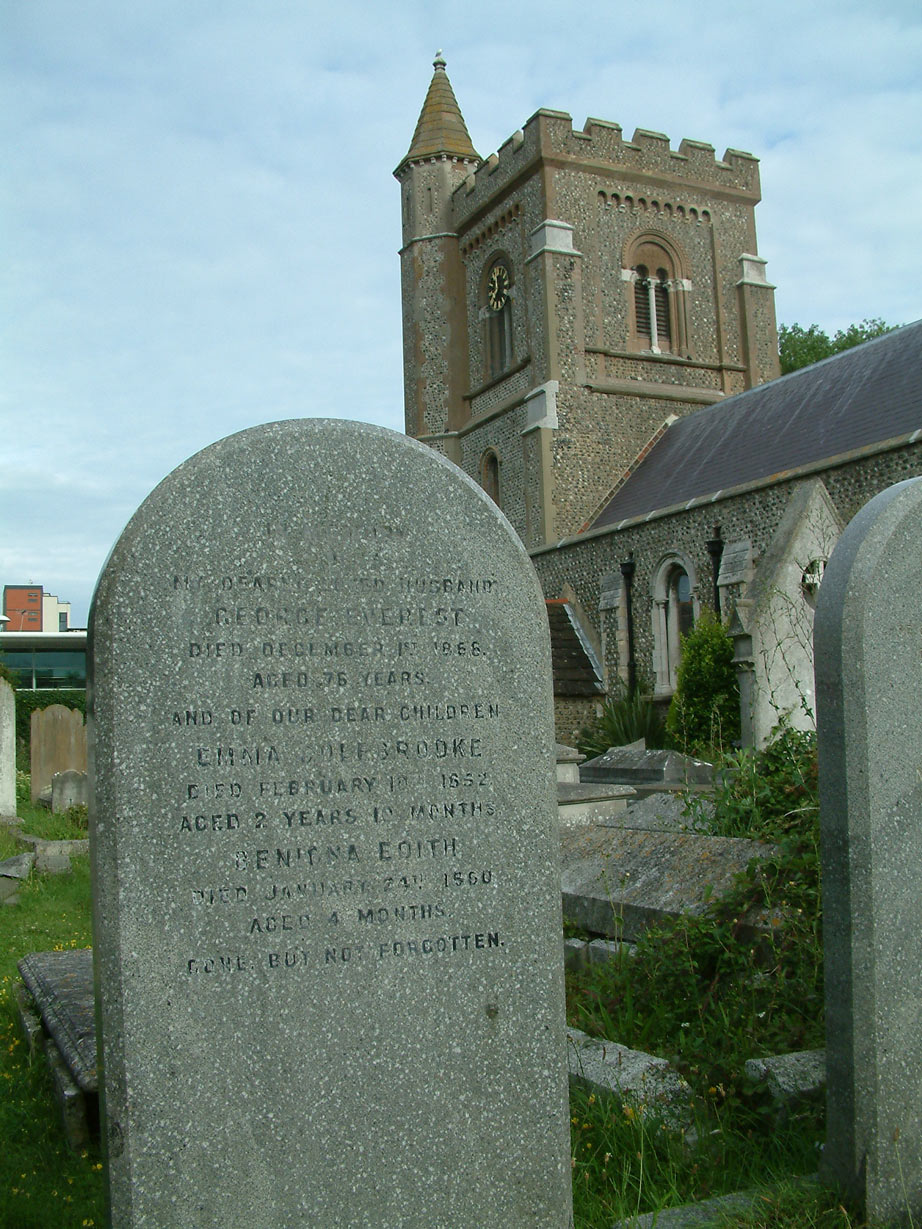
Everest's grave, St Andrew's Church, Hove, East Sussex.

In 1847, Everest published An Account of the Measurement of Two Sections of the Meridional Arc of India, for which he was awarded a medal by the Royal Astronomical Society. He was later elected to fellowship of the Royal Asiatic Society and the Royal Geographical Society. Everest was promoted to colonel in 1854, made a Commander of the Order of the Bath in February 1861, and created a Knight Bachelor in March 1861.

He died at his home in Hyde Park Gardens on 1 December 1866, and was buried in St Andrew's Church, Hove near Brighton.

== Naming of Mount Everest ==
George Everest had no direct connection with the mountain which bears his name, which he never saw. He was, however, responsible for hiring Andrew Scott Waugh, who made the first formal observations of the mountain, and Radhanath Sikdar, who calculated its height. Before its significance was realised, Mount Everest was originally known as Peak "B" and later as Peak XV. In March 1856, Waugh wrote to the Royal Geographical Society to announce that the mountain was believed to be the highest in the world, and proposed that it be named "after my illustrious predecessor", as it was "without any local name that we can discover" – the "native appellation, if it has any, will not very likely be ascertained before we are allowed to penetrate into Nepal". There were in fact several native names among the Nepalese and Tibetans, but those areas were closed off to the British at the time and people living further to the south of the Himalayas did not have a specific name for the peak. In the decade after 1856, Waugh's proposal was widely debated by the Royal Geographical Society and similar bodies. Other scholars of India put forward native names that they believed to be correct, such as Brian Houghton Hodgson's "Deva-dhunga" and Hermann Schlagintweit's "Gaurisankar". Everest himself objected to his name being used, as "the native of India" could not pronounce it and it could not be easily written in Hindi. Nonetheless, in 1865 the society officially settled on "Mount Everest" as the name.

== Family ==
Everest had several siblings, including two younger brothers. George's first younger brother was Robert Everest, chaplain to the East India Company and author of A Journey Through the United States and Part of Canada. His second (his youngest brother) was the Thomas Roupell Everest, the father of Mary Everest and a lay homoeopath. George Everest's third child, Ethel Everest, was an associate of Emma Cons and friend of Lilian Baylis. She provided financial support for the founding of Morley College in south London.

One of Everest's sons, Lancelot Feilding Everest, was educated at Harrow School and Trinity College, Cambridge, and was called to the Bar by Lincoln's Inn. He practised as a barrister in chambers in London and was also the principal author of The Law of Estoppel. Lancelot's eldest son, Cyril Feilding Everest, enlisted in the Canadian Infantry on 17 November 1914 and was killed in action on 9 October 1916 at the Battle of the Somme.

Everest's niece, Mary Everest, married mathematician George Boole in Gloucestershire on 11 September 1855. In spite of the absence of formal training, Mary was a fine mathematician in her own right, as was one of her daughters, Alicia Boole Stott. Alicia's son, Leonard Boole Stott, studied medicine and became a pioneer in the treatment and control of tuberculosis, work for which he was later appointed an OBE Mary Boole's daughter Margaret was the mother of Sir Geoffrey Ingram Taylor OM, a graduate of Trinity College, Cambridge, a renowned mathematician and physicist, and a major figure in fluid dynamics and wave theory.

== Sir George Everest house in Mussoorie, India ==
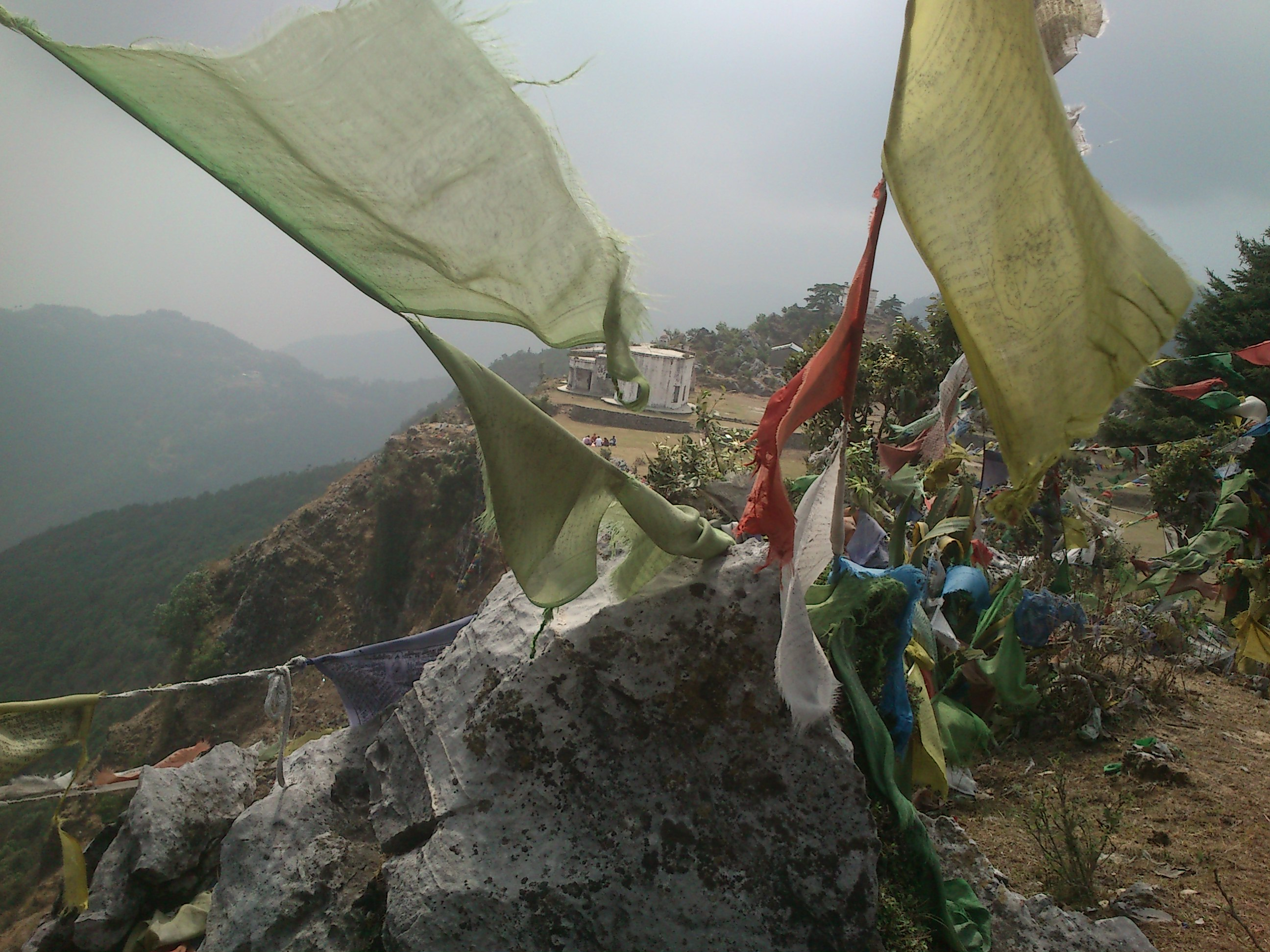
Park House from above

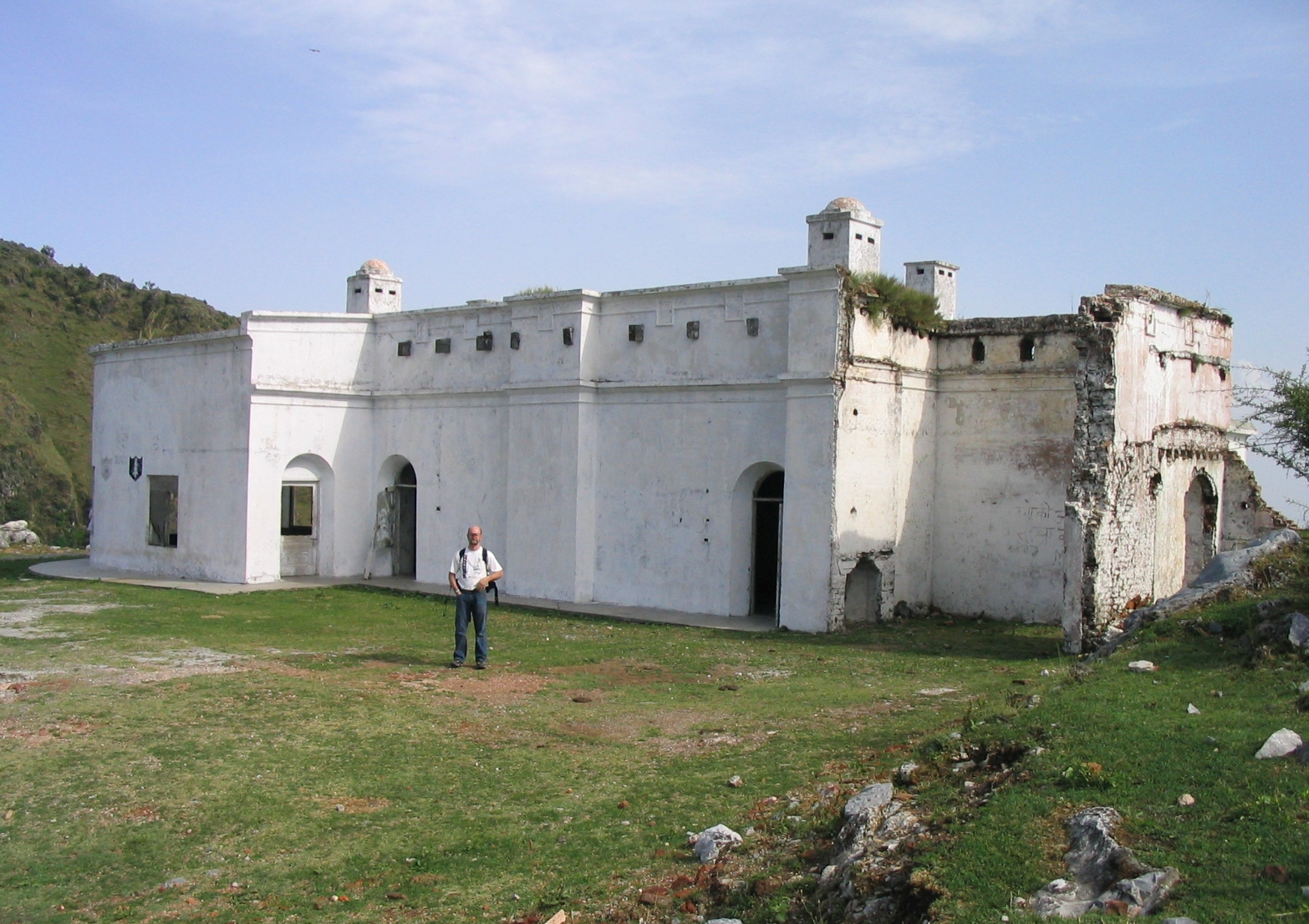
Sir George Everest's House and Laboratory, also known as Park House

Everest owned a house in Mussoorie, India for about 11 years. He purchased it, sight unseen, from General William Sampson Whish (1787–1853). Built in 1832, the house is known today as Sir George Everest's House and Laboratory, or Park House. The house is in Park Estate about 6 kilometres (4 mi) west of Gandhi Chowk / Library Bazaar (the west end of Mall Road in Mussoorie). The location has panoramic views of the Doon Valley on one side and the Aglar River valley and the Himalayan Range to the north. After renovation at a cost of Rs 23.71 crore, the house was opened as a museum in December 2021.

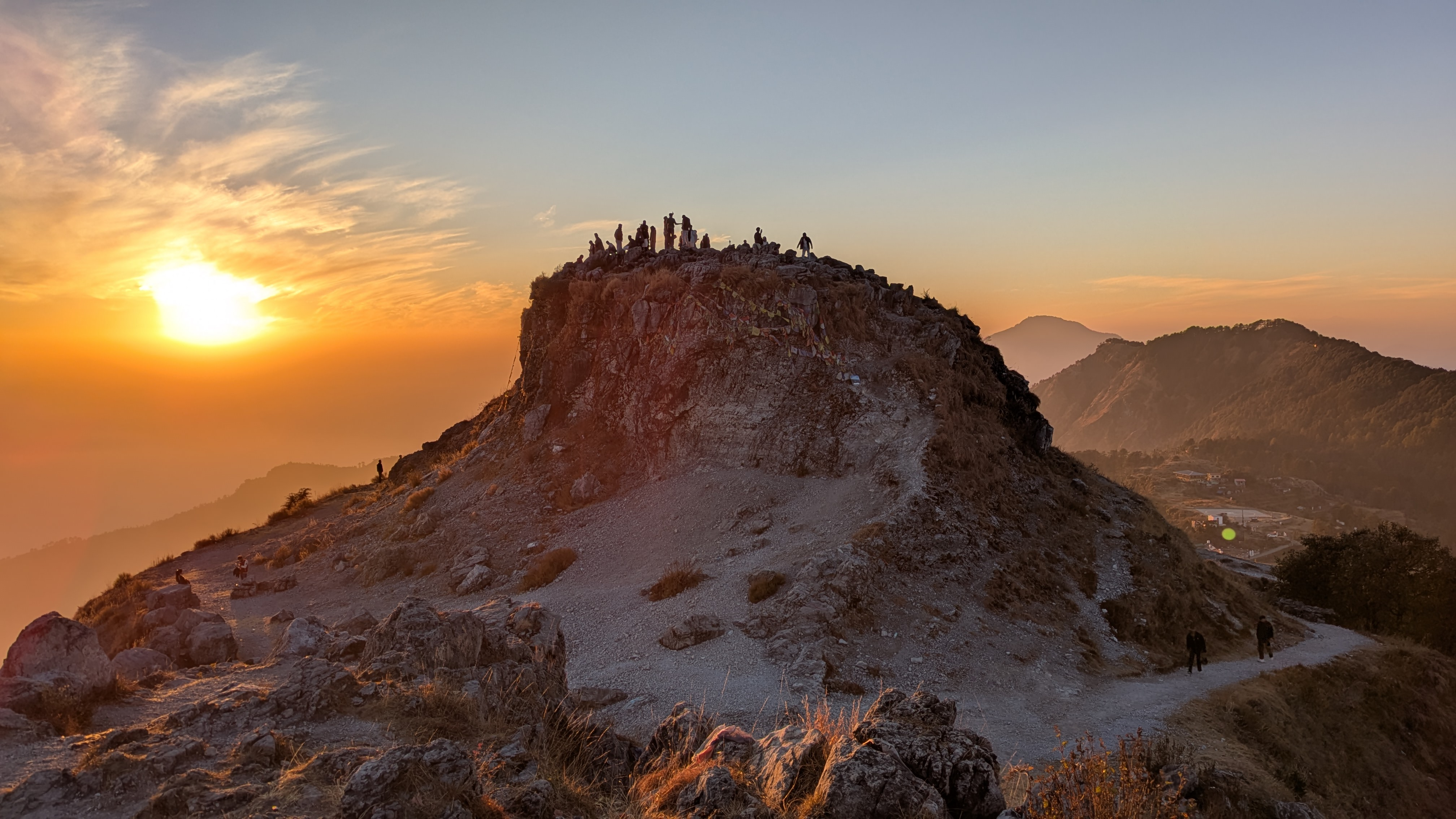
George Everest Peak, above the house, is a popular spot at sunset

== Arms ==
Coat of arms of George Everest

Notes
Certified by Conrad Swan, York Herald, in 1990.
Motto
Semper Otium Rogo Divos
