= Surveyor General of India =

Government role in Survey of India

The Surveyor General of India is the Head of Department of Survey of India, a department under the Ministry of Science and Technology of the Government of India. The Surveyor General is also the most senior member of the Survey of India Service, an organised engineering service under the Union of India.

The current Surveyor General is Hitesh Kumar S Makwana.

== Surveyors General ==
The East India Company appointed James Rennell to survey the Bengal Presidency in 1767. Lord Clive appointed him as Surveyor General. Colin Mackenzie was appointed Surveyor General of Madras Presidency in 1810, but these posts were abolished in 1815 and Mackenzie was made the first Surveyor General of India. A list of Surveyors General and their tenure:

- 1815–1821: Colin Mackenzie
- 1821–1823: John Hodgson
- 1823–1826: Valentine Blacker
- 1826–1829: John Hodgson
- 1829–1830: Henry Walpole
- 1830–1843: Sir George Everest
- 1843–1861: Andrew Scott Waugh
- 1861–1878: Henry Edward Landor Thuillier
- 1878–1883: James Thomas Walker
- 1884–1887: George Charles Depree
- 1887–1895: Henry Ravenshaw Thuillier
- 1895–1899: Charles Strahan
- 1899–1904: St George Corbet Gore
- 1904–1911: Colonel Francis Bacon Longe
- 1911–1919: Sidney Gerald Burrard
- 1919–1924: Charles Henry Dudley Ryder
- 1924–1928: Edward Aldborough Tandy
- 1928–1933: Robert Henry Thomas
- 1933–1937: Harold John Couchman
- 1937–1941: Sir Clinton Gresham Lewis
- 1941–1946: Sir Edward Oliver Wheeler
- 1946–1951: George Frederick Heaney
- 1951–1956: Ian Henry Richard Wilson
- 1956–1961: Brig. Gambhir Singh
- May 1961 – December 1961: (#) Col Rajendar Singh Kalha
- January 1962 – April 1962: Eustace Randolf Wilson
- May 1962 – June 1966: Brig Gambhir Singh
- July 1966 – August 1969: Brig Jitindar Singh Paintal
- September 1969 – June 1971: (#) Brig Jamshed A.F. Dalal
- July 1971 – April 1972: Brig Jitindar Singh Paintal
- May 1972 – March 1976: (#) Dr Hari Narain, Padam Shri
- Apr 1976 – November 1981: Lt Gen Kishori Lal Khosla
- December 1981 – January 1988: Lt Gen Girish Chandra Agarwal
- February 1988 – December 1988: (#) Maj Gen D M Gupta
- January 1989 – November 1990: Lt Gen Surinder Mohan Chadha
- December 1990 – March 1991: (#) A K Sanyal
- April 1991 – June 1992: Vinay Kant Nagar
- July 1992 – December 1992: Lt Gen C B Jhaldiyal
- January 1993 – April 1994: (#) Maj Gen D P Gupta
- May 1994 – July 1994: (#) P R Dutta
- August 1994 – September 1994: (#) B B Sinha
- October 1994 – July 1996: (#) Maj Gen Surinder Prakash Mehta
- August 1996 – March 1997: Lt Gen Surinder Prakash Mehta
- April 1997 – March 2001: Lt Gen Ashok Kumar Ahuja
- April 2001 – November 2001: Lt Gen Ashok Kumar Ahuja (on Extn)
- December 2001 – February 2005: Dr Prithvish Nag (on Deputation)
- March 2005 – June 2005: Vacant
- July 2005 – March 2007: Maj Gen M Gopal Rao
- April 2007 – December 2007: Maj Gen M Gopal Rao (on contract)
- January 2008 – June 2008: (#) Maj Gen R S Tanwar
- 01 July 2008 – 13 July 2008: (#) Dr T Ramaswami, DST
- 14 July 2008 – October 2008: (#) Dr Prithvish Nag
- November 2008 – July 2009: (#) Dr T Ramaswami, DST
- August 2009 – September 2009: (#) Maj Gen R S Tanwar
- October 2009 – November 2009: (#) Maj Gen Manoj Tayal
- November 2009 – 24 August 2010: (#) Dr T Ramaswami, DST
- 25 August 2010 – 30 April 2015: Dr Swarna Subba Rao
- 01 May 2015 – 07 April 2016: (#) Rajendra Mani Tripathi
- 08 April 2016 – 30 June 2017: Dr Swarna Subba Rao
- 01 July 2017 – 30 September 2017: (#) Maj Gen VP Srivastava
- 01 October 2017 – 30 January 2018: (#) Maj Gen Girish Kumar
- 31 January 2018 – 31 December 2019: Lt Gen Girish Kumar, VSM
- 01 January 2020 – 14 January 2020: (#) Sh Naveen Tomar
- 15 January 2020 – 15 January 2021: (On Contract) Lt. Gen. Girish Kumar (Retd), VSM
- 16 January 2021 – 12 January 2022 : Sh Naveen Tomar
- 13 January 2022 - 5 November 2023: Shri Sunil Kumar(IFS)Indian Forest Service Joint Secretary, DST (F/N).
- 6 November 2023 - Present: Hitesh Kumar S Makwana

== See also ==
- Superintending Surveyor
- Trigonometrical Survey of India
