= Ernest Tandy =

English cricketer and British Army officer

Brigadier-General Ernest Tandy CMG DSO
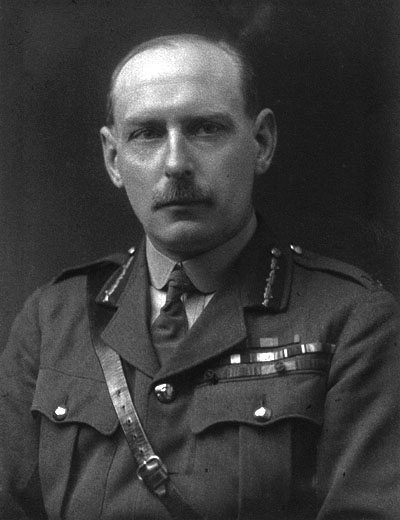
- Tandy in 1919
- Born: 13 May 1879; Axbridge, Somerset, England
- Died: 6 May 1953 (aged 73); St Pancras, London, England
- Military career
- Allegiance: United Kingdom
- Branch: British Army
- Service years: 1898–1934
- Rank: Brigadier-General
- Unit: Royal Artillery
- Conflicts: Second Boer War; First World War
- Awards: Distinguished Service Order; Companion of the Order of St Michael and St George

Brigadier-General Ernest Napper Tandy, CMG, DSO (13 May 1879 – 6 May 1953) was a British Army officer who played first-class cricket for Somerset in 1904 and 1905. He also played one first-class match for Marylebone Cricket Club (MCC) in 1908.

== Cricket career ==
Educated at Wellington College, Tandy was a right-handed middle-order batsman. He made his first-class cricket debut in a single match for Somerset against Sussex in 1904, scoring eight in the only innings possible in a rain-ruined game. A year later, he reappeared in another single game, this time scoring 0 and 17 against Yorkshire. A fairly regular player of non-first-class cricket both for MCC and for other amateur sides, he played just one more first-class match and scored 26 and 30, his highest totals, in the match against Leicestershire at Lord's in 1908.

== Military career ==
Tandy was a career army officer. He was a cadet at the Royal Military Academy, Woolwich and joined the Royal Artillery as a second lieutenant on 26 February 1898.

He fought in the Second Boer War, leaving Southampton for South Africa on the SS Canada in early February 1900. Promotion to lieutenant followed on 16 February 1901. He was mentioned in Sir Redvers Buller's report to Lord Roberts on the campaign: "2nd Lieutenant E. N. Tandy, No. 2 Company, Western Division, R.G.A., was specially mentioned to me for his services when detached with two 12-pr. Q.F. guns with a column under Lieut.-Colonel E. C. Bethune, 16th Lancers." The war ended in June 1902, and Tandy returned to the United Kingdom on the SS Syria two months later, arriving in Southampton in early September.

Promoted in February 1904 to captain, he was appointed adjutant at the Ordnance College, later the Royal Military College of Science, at Woolwich, then part of Kent, later that year.

On 27 August 1914 he was made a staff captain. By 1915, he was a major within the Royal Artillery and the following year he was a temporary lieutenant-colonel, having been assigned as a general staff officer, grade 1. At the end of the First World War he was temporarily promoted to be a brigadier-general and by this time he was invested with the Distinguished Service Order and was invested as a Companion of the Order of St Michael and St George.

The temporary elevation ended at the end of 1919 and Tandy retired from the army in 1921 and was placed in the reserve of officers with the honorary rank of brigadier general. He was granted the temporary rank of colonel commandant while employed in India as a surveyor general.

He finally retired from the reserve list in 1934. He was a younger brother of Maurice Tandy.
