= Survey of India =

Indian agency for mapping and surveying

Survey and mapping agency overview
- Formed: 1767; 259 years ago
- Jurisdiction: Government of India
- Headquarters: Hathibarkala Estate, New Cantt Road, Dehradun, Uttarakhand, India
- Employees: 5,500 (2016)
- Minister responsible: Dr Jitendra Singh, Minister of Science and Technology
- Survey and mapping agency executive: Sri Shailesh Kumar Sinha, Surveyor General of India
- Parent department: Department of Science and Technology
- Website: surveyofindia.gov.in

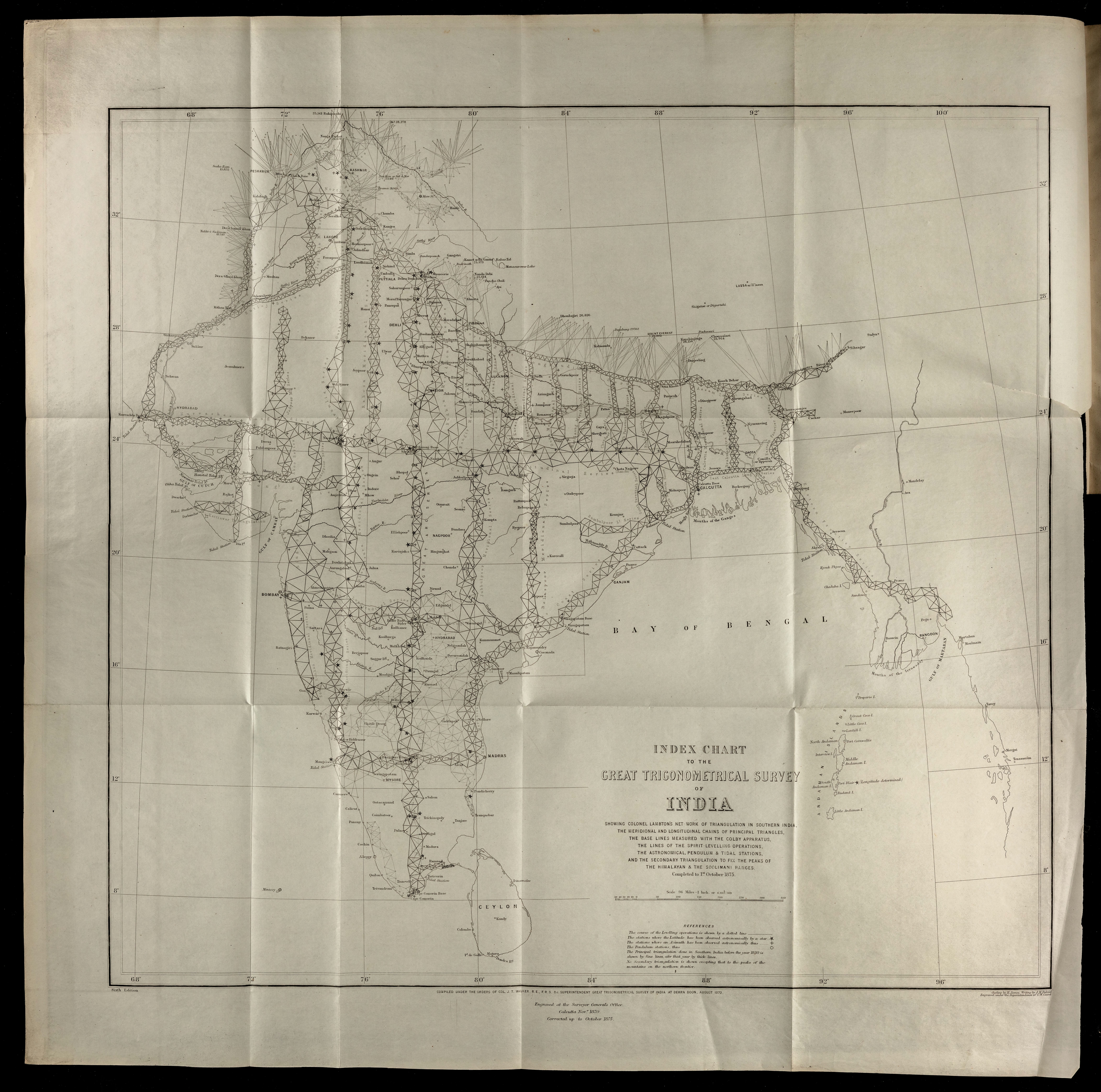
A map showing the triangles and transects used in the Great Trigonometrical Survey (1802–1852), produced in 1870.

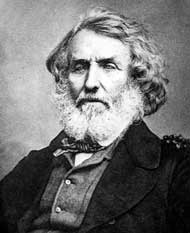
Surveyor-General of India George Everest (b.1790-d.1866) under whom GTS was completed and Mount Everest was named in his honour.

The Survey of India is India's central engineering agency in charge of mapping and surveying. Set up in 1767 to help consolidate the territories of the British East India Company, it is one of the oldest Engineering Departments of the Government of India. Its members are from Survey of India Service cadre of Civil Services of India. It is headed by the Surveyor General of India. At present, the Surveyor General is Sri Shailesh Kumar Sinha.

== History ==
The history of the Survey of India dates back to the 18th century. "First modern scientific survey of India" was undertaken by John Mather in 1793–96 on instructions of Superintendent of Salem and Baramahal, Col. Alexander Read. The present Dharmapuri district, Krishnagiri district and North Arcot in western Tamil Nadu were then called Baramahal.

The Great Trigonometrical Survey (1802–1852) was started by British surveyor Col. William Lambton on 10 April 1802, heading from St. Thomas Mount in Chennai to the foothills of the Himalayas. 36 inch huge half ton weight Theodolite was used, which took 57 days to measure the 12-km base line. This 5-decade project was completed under Survey General Lt. George Everest in the year 1852. Pioneering mathematician and Surveyor Radhanath Sikdar measured Mount Everest in 1852, with a height of 29,002 feet. Modern measurements indicate the height is 29,037 feet. This is regarded as the beginning of a new age of systematic topographical mapping in India succeeding the classical age, and the founding of one of the oldest survey and mapping agencies in the world.

== Organisation ==
The Survey of India, headquartered at Dehradun, Uttarakhand, has 18 geospatial divisions ranging from the prediction of tides to aerial survey. It has 23 Geo-spatial Directorate spread across India, each catering to the respective administrative area. Surveyors are the backbone of Survey of India. Appointments to Group 'A' posts in the Junior Time Scale (Dy Supdtg Surveyor) in Survey of India are made on the basis of competitive Indian Engineering Services examination conducted by the Union Public Service Commission . The important posts/ grades in Survey of India are in the following order of seniority: Draftsman, Plane Tabler, Survey Assistant, Surveyor, Officer Surveyor, Deputy Superintending Surveyor, Superintending Surveyor, Superintending Surveyor (Non-Functional Second Grade)/Deputy Director, Director/Deputy Surveyor General, Additional Surveyor General, Surveyor General.

== Responsibilities ==
- Advisor to the Indian Government: The Survey of India acts as an adviser to the Government of India on all cartography-related matters, such as geodesy, photogrammetry, mapping and map reproduction.
- Geo names: Survey of India is responsible for the naming convention and spellings of names of geographical features of India.
- Certification and publication: Scrutiny and certification of external boundaries of India and Coastline on maps published by the other agencies including private publishers. Publication of tide tables (one year in advance) and maps of India.
- Surveys: geodetic datum, geodetic control network, topographical control, geophysical surveys, cadastral surveying, geological maps, aeronautical charts within India, such as for forests, army cantonments, large scale cities, guide maps, developmental or conservation projects, etc.
- National borders: Demarcation of the borders and external boundaries of India as well as advice on the demarcation of inter-state boundaries.
- Oceanic tidal prediction: Undertake prediction of tides at 44 ports including 14 foreign ports.
- Research and development: In the area of photogrammetry, cartography, geodesy, topographical surveys and indigenisation of technology.
- Training: Training for the central and state government departments as well as from foreign countries.

== Maps ==
The Survey of India publishes maps and the unrestricted category maps can be obtained from its several Geo-spatial directorate. Restricted category maps require due approval from government authorities. Many other rules govern the sale and use of Survey of India maps. Only an Indian citizen may purchase topographic maps and these may not be exported from India for any reason. On 15 February 2021, the Government of India announced changes to the country's mapping policy which frees up lot of earlier restrictions related to mapping. A list of restrictions proposed is published by DST for comments by 30 July 2021.

== Gallery ==
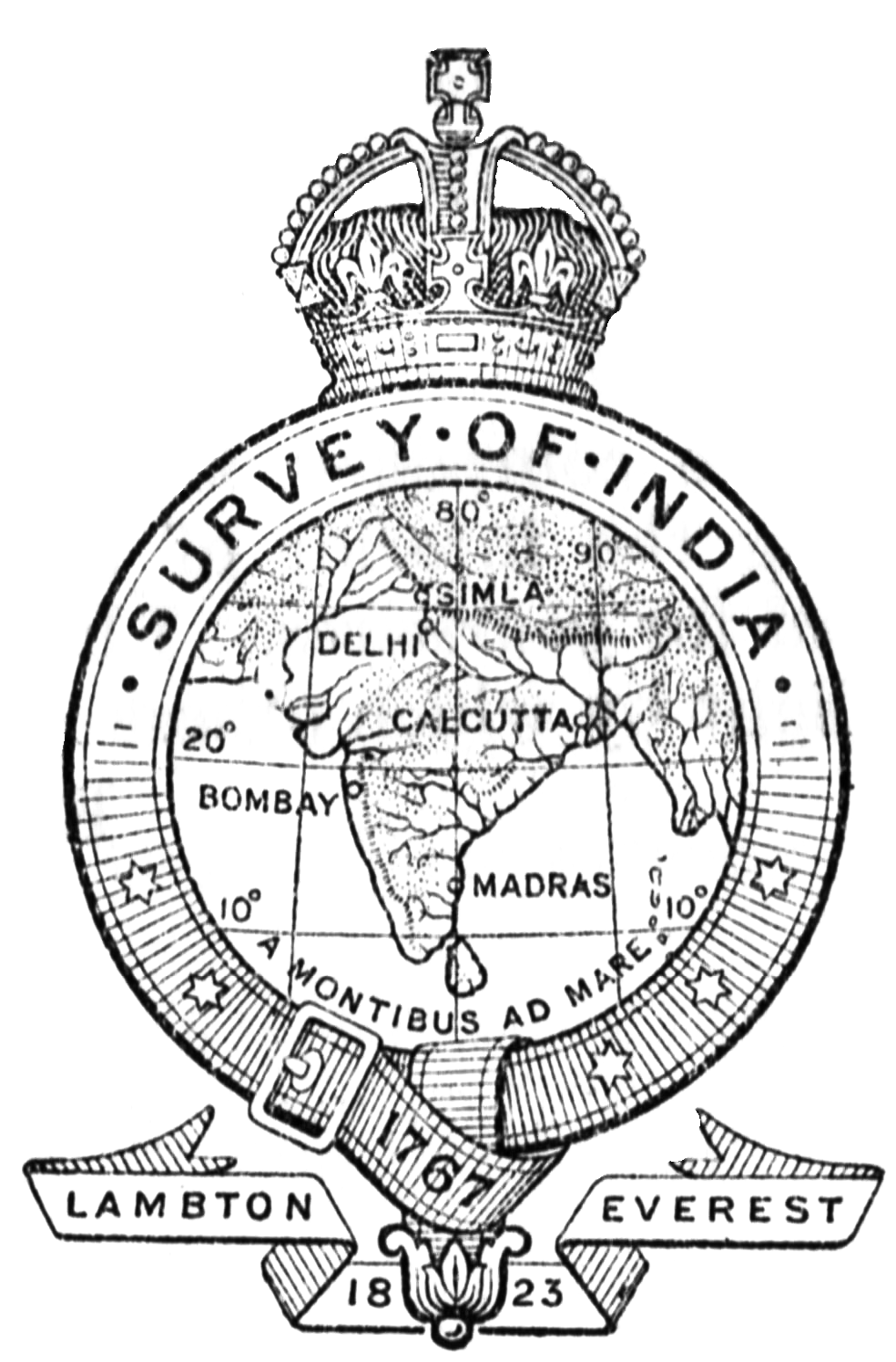
Old logo of the Survey of India

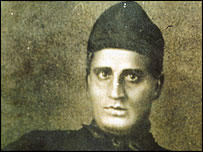
Radhanath Sikdar, a mathematician who first calculated the height of Mount Everest in 1852.

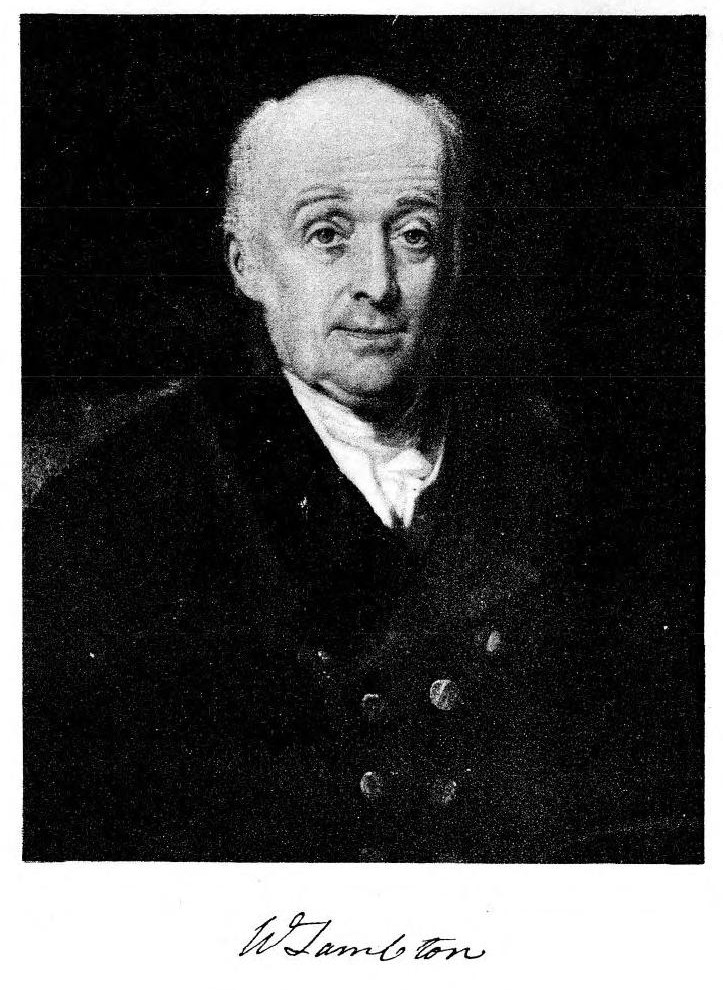
William Lambton (1753 – 19 January 1823) started Great Trigonometrical Survey (1802–1852).

== See also ==
- Survey of India Service
- Cartography of India
- Linguistic Survey of India
