= Eddie Fisher discography =

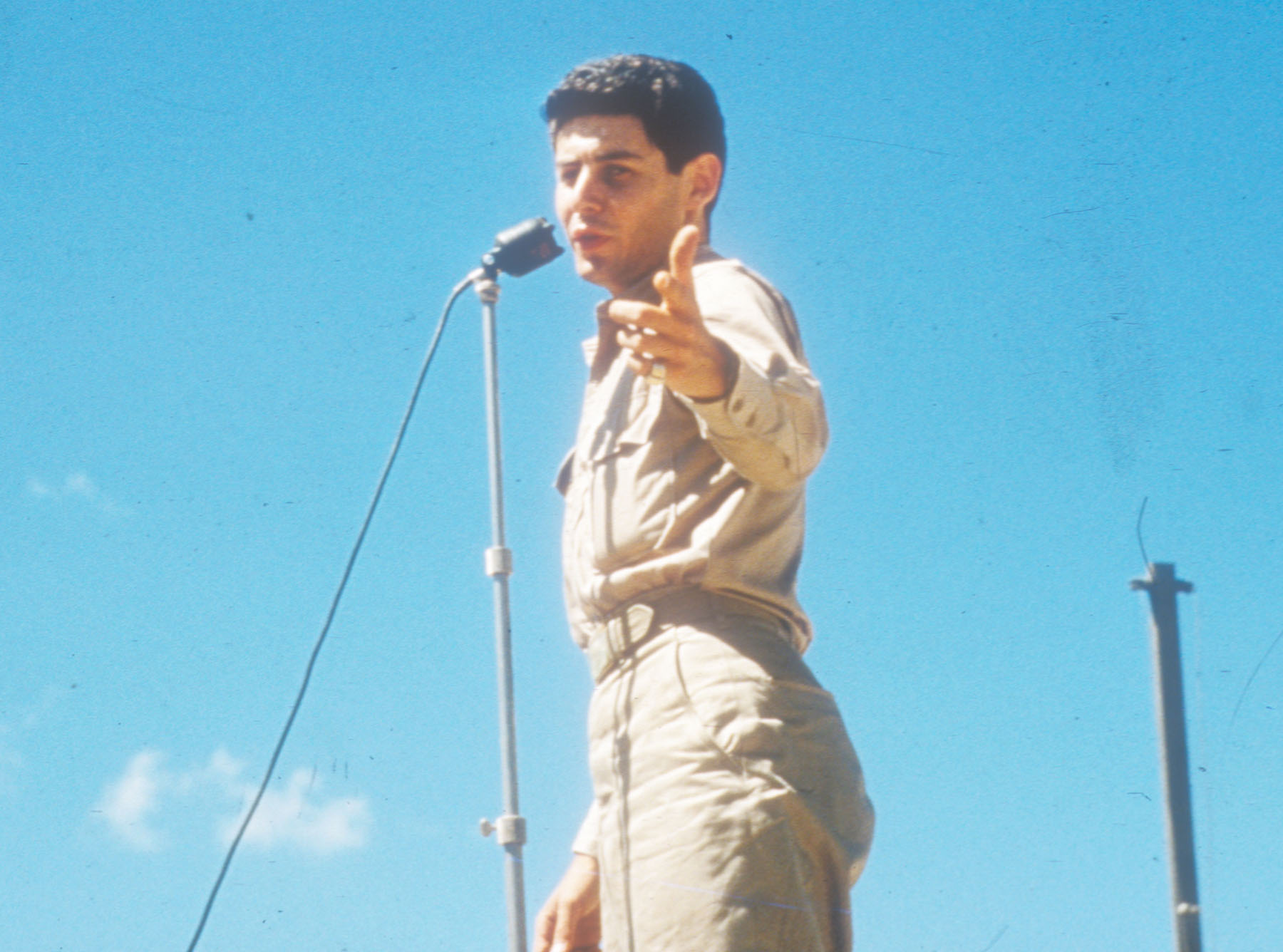
- Studio albums: 18
- EPs: 13
- Live albums: 1
- Compilation albums: 6
- Singles: 83
- Other charted songs: 15

An American singer and actor, Edwin Jack Fisher (1928 – 2010), known professionally as Eddie Fisher, released 15 studio albums, one original live album, various compilation and archival projects, and 83 singles. Along with fellow vocalists Perry Como and Patti Page, Fisher was one of the most commercially successful singers in the first half of the 1950s. His debut single was 1948's "You Can't Be True, Dear" with the Marlin Sisters. Fisher achieved his breakout in 1950 with "Thinking of You" which hit the US pop top-5.

Fisher consistently released singles, and in 1951, five hit the pop top-20, with "Any Time" peaking at number 2 and becoming his first gold record. In 1952 RCA Victor issued his first LP Eddie Fisher Sings, which was a commercial success. Two other LPs were released that year, both nearly topping the charts. He scored nine top-25 singles that year as well, and "Everything I Have Is Yours" marked his first UK chart entry, climbing to number 8 there. "Outside of Heaven" completely topped the UK charts months after. In September 1952, Fisher had his first number-one hit with "Wish You Were Here". It was ranked at number 7 on the year-end Billboard chart. 1953 earned Fisher two more US number-one hits with "I'm Walking Behind You" and "Oh! My Pa-Pa".

In 1954, Fisher scored his fourth and final number-one hit with "I Need You Now ", and a final top-5 pop hit with "Count Your Blessings (Instead of Sheep)". The next year, Fisher continued to have commercial success, and his LP I Love You and single "Heart" both reached the top-10 on their respective charts. 1956 saw Fisher hit the top-40 one last time with "Cindy, Oh Cindy", before his chart performance heavily declined. In 1957, all of his releases either missed the charts or just climbed to the bottom half of the charts. RCA Victor would drop Fisher by 1960 after limited sales.

Fisher returned in 1961 and hit the charts once again with "Tonight", earning him a top-15 entry on the newly published Billboard Easy Listening chart. Fisher eventually formed his own record label, called Ramrod Records. Under it, he released his first live album titled Eddie Fisher at the Winter Garden, which did modestly on the LP charts. In 1965, Fisher signed Dot Records. The contract granted him four albums, the first of which, Eddie Fisher Today! marked a strong return to all of the LP charts. The album contained contemporary material, but Dot scheduled Fisher to record traditional pop standards as well, with Young and Foolish, which modestly hit the charts. As the contract ended, Fisher re-signed with RCA again.

Under the arrangement of Nelson Riddle, Fisher recorded "Games That Lovers Play", which became his most successful song in the 1960s. It hit number 2 on the Easy Listening chart and number 45 on the pop charts. It spawned his best-selling album as well. "People Like You" had fewer, but similar results. This comeback did not last long. After the lackluster performance of You Ain't Heard Nothin' Yet in 1968, Fisher left the label. His only recordings after that were the soul-themed "I'll Pick a Rose for My Rose" (1969) and a return album titled After All (1984).

== Albums ==
=== Studio albums ===
Title	Album details	Peak positions	
Title	Album details	US BB	US CB
Eddie Fisher Sings	Released: 1952; Label: RCA Victor; Formats: 10-inch LP	5	—
I'm in the Mood for Love	Released: 1952; Label: RCA Victor; Formats: 10-inch LP	3	—
Christmas with Eddie Fisher	Released: 1952; Label: RCA Victor; Formats: 10-inch LP	2	—
Eddie Fisher Sings Irving Berlin Favorites	Released: 1954; Label: RCA Victor; Formats: 10-inch LP	—	—
May I Sing to You?	Released: January 1954; Label: RCA Victor; Formats: 10-inch LP	4	—
I Love You	Released: 1955; Label: RCA Victor; Formats: LP	8	10
Eddie Fisher Sings Academy Award Winning Songs	Released: 1955; Label: RCA Victor; Formats: LP	—	—
As Long as There's Music	Released: 1958; Label: RCA Victor; Formats: LP	—	—
Tonight with Eddie Fisher	Released: 1960; Label: Ramrod; Formats: LP	—	—
Eddie Fisher Today!	Released: May 1965; Label: Dot; Formats: LP	52	74
When I Was Young	Released: 1965; Label: Dot; Formats: LP	—	—
Mary Christmas	Released: Late 1965; Label: Dot; Formats: LP	—	131
Young and Foolish	Released: December 1965; Label: Dot; Formats: LP	—	108
This Is Eddie Fisher	Released: 1966; Label: Hamilton; Formats: LP	—	—
Games That Lovers Play	Released: October 1966; Label: RCA Victor; Formats: LP	72	70
People Like You	Released: April 1967; Label: RCA Victor; Formats: LP	193	—
You Ain't Heard Nothin' Yet	Released: September 27, 1968; Label: RCA Victor; Formats: LP	—	—
After All	Released: 1984; Label: Bainbridge; Formats: LP, CD	—	—

=== Live albums ===
Year	Album	Peak positions
Year	Album	US
1963	Eddie Fisher at the Winter Garden: Recorded in Winter Garden, New York City, New York; Fisher's only live album	128

=== Compilation albums ===
Several Fisher compilations are noteworthy for either their chart success, as noted by 9 of them listed below, or the material included

Year	Title	Peak chart positions	
Year	Title	US	UK
1957	Thinking of You: Label: RCA Victor	—	—
1958	Heart!: Label: RCA Camden	—	—
1962	Eddie Fisher's Greatest Hits: Label: RCA Victor	—	—
1963	Bring Back the Thrill: Label: RCA Camden	—	—
1965	The Best of Eddie Fisher: Label: RCA Victor	—	—
1972	This is Eddie Fisher: Label: RCA Victor	—	—
1988	The Very Best of Eddie Fisher: Label: MCA	—	—
1989	All Time Greatest Hits Vol.1: Label: RCA	—	—
2001	Greatest Hits: Label: RCA	—	—

=== Extended plays ===
Year	Title	Peak chart positions	
Year	Title	US	UK
1953	Cheek To Cheek - Irving Berlin Songs: Label: RCA Victor	—	—
1954	May I Sing to You?: Label: RCA Victor	—	—
1954	Broadway Classics: Label: RCA Victor	—	—
1954	A Girl, A Girl: Label: RCA Victor	—	—
1955	Souvenir record from 'Coke Time': Label: RCA Victor	—	—
1955	I Love You Pt. 1: Label: RCA Victor	—	—
1955	Dungaree Doll: Label: RCA Victor	—	—
1955	Eddie Fisher Sings Aceademy Award Winning Songs Vol. 1: Label: RCA Victor	—	—
1955	Eddie Fisher Sings Academy Award Winning Songs Volume 2: Label: RCA Victor	—	—
1955	Eddie Fisher Sings Academy Award Winning Songs Volume 3: Label: RCA Victor	—	—
1955	Eddie Fisher Sings Academy Award Winning Songs Volume 3: Label: RCA Victor	—	—
1957	Thinking Of You: Label: RCA Victor	—	—
1958	Anytime: Label: RCA Victor	—	—
1965	Eddie Fisher Today!: Label: Dot Records	—	—

== Singles ==
=== 1940 - 1950s ===
List of singles, with selected chart positions, showing other relevant details
Title	Year	Peak chart positions			Album
Title	Year	US Hot 100	US CB	UK	Album
"You Can't Be True, Dear" (with Marlin Sisters) "Toolie Oolie Doolie (The Yodel Polka)" (by Marlin Sisters)	1948	— —	— —	— —	Non-LP tracks
"My Bolero (Where The Bolero Began)" "Foolish Tears"	1949	— —	— —	— —	Non-LP tracks
"Sorry" "Yesterday's Roses"	1949	— —	— —	— —	Non-LP tracks
"You Love Me" "When You Kiss A Stranger"	1950	— —	— —	— —	Non-LP tracks
"Where In The World" "A Little Bit Independent"	1950	— —	— —	— —	Non-LP tracks
"Nightwind (Sighing)" "Warm Kisses In The Cool Of Night"	1950	— —	— —	— —	Non-LP tracks
"Thinking of You" "If You Should Leave Me"	1950	5 —	3 —	— —	Eddie Fisher Sings
"My Mammy (The Sun Shines East - The Sun Shines West)" "My Blue Heaven"	1951	— —	— —	— —	Non-LP tracks
"What Can I Say After I Say I'm Sorry?" "My Mom"	1951	— —	— —	— —	Non-LP tracks
"My Buddy" "At Sundown"	1951	— —	— —	— —	Non-LP tracks
"Bring Back The Thrill" "If It Hadn't Been For You"	1951	14 —	— —	— —	Non-LP tracks
"Unless" "I Have No Heart"	1951	17 —	— —	— —	Non-LP tracks
"Turn Back The Hands Of Time" "I Can't Go On Without You"	1951	8 —	8 —	— —	Thinking Of You
"Tell Me Why" "Trust in Me"	1951	7; 29	— —	— —	Heart!
"Any Time" "Never Before"	1951	2 —	3 —	— —	Non-LP tracks
"Just Say I Love Her" "Sorry"	1952	— —	— —	— —	Eddie Fisher Sings
"If You Should Leave Me" "A Little Bit Independent"	1952	— —	— —	— —	Eddie Fisher Sings
"I Remember When" "Am I Wasting My Time On You"	1952	29 —	— —	— —	Eddie Fisher Sings
"I Love You Because" "Thinking of You"	1952	— —	— —	— —	I'm in the Mood for Love
"You'll Never Know" "I'm in the Mood for Love"	1952	— —	— —	— —	I'm in the Mood for Love
"Everything I Have Is Yours" "Hold Me"	1952	23 —	38 —	8 —	I'm in the Mood for Love
"Forgive Me" "That's The Chance You Take"	1952	7; 25	7 —	— —	Non-LP tracks
"I'm Yours" "Just a Little Lovin' (Will Go a Long Way)"	1952	5; 20	2 —	— —	Non-LP tracks
"Wish You Were Here" "The Hand Of Fate"	1952	1; 24	2 —	8 —	Thinking Of You
"That Old Feeling" "Full Moon and Empty Arms"	1952	— —	— —	— —	Non-LP tracks
"Lady of Spain" "Outside of Heaven"	1952	9; 10	4; 10	— 1	Non-LP tracks
"Silent Night" "White Christmas"	1952	— —	— —	— —	Christmas with Eddie Fisher
"I've Got You Under My Skin" "Paradise"	1952	— —	— —	— —	I'm in the Mood for Love
"Christmas Day" "You're All I Want for Christmas"	1952	22; 22	— —	— —	Christmas with Eddie Fisher
"Even Now" "Unafraid"	1953	7 —	9 —	— —	Non-LP Tracks
"Downhearted" "How Do You Speak to an Angel?"	1953	5; 14	16; 25	3 —	Thinking Of You
"I'm Walking Behind You" "Just Another Polka"	1953	1; 24	1; 18	1 —	Non-LP tracks
"With These Hands" "When I Was Young (Yes, Very Young)"	1953	7 —	8 —	— —	Non-LP tracks
"Many Times" "Just to Be with You"	1953	4; 18	8 —	— —	Non-LP tracks
"Oh! My Pa-Pa" "Until You Said Goodbye"	1953	1 —	1 —	9 —	Thinking Of You
"A Girl, A Girl" "(With All My Heart And Soul)"	1954	6; 14	6; 12	— —	Non-LP tracks
"My Friend" "Green Years"	1954	15; 8	12; 13	— —	Non-LP tracks
"I Need You Now" "Heaven Was Never Like This"	1954	1; 21	1 —	13 —	Non-LP tracks
"Count Your Blessings (Instead of Sheep)" "Fanny"	1954	5; 29	8; 18	— —	Heart!
"A Man Chases A Girl (Until She Catches Him)" "(I'm Always Hearing) Wedding Bells"	1955	16; 20	16; 13	— 11	Non-LP tracks
"Just One More Time" "Take My Love"	1955	— —	27; 36	— —	Non-LP tracks
"Heart" "Near To You"	1955	6 —	10 —	— —	Heart!
"Song Of The Dreamer" "Don't Stay Away Too Long"	1955	11; 16	10; 41	— —	Non-LP tracks
"Magic Fingers" "I Wanna Go Where You Go, Do What You Do (Then I'll Be Happy)"	1955	52; 75	33; 26	— —	Non-LP tracks
"Dungaree Doll" "Everybody's Got A Home But Me"	1955	7; 20	9; 34	— —	Heart!
"No Other One" "Without You"	1956	65; 41	29; 28	— —	Non-LP tracks
"On The Street Where You Live" "Sweet Heartaches"	1956	18; 42	— 35	— —	Non-LP tracks
"Oh My Maria" "If I'm Elected"	1956	80 —	— —	— —	Non-LP tracks
"Cindy, Oh Cindy" "Around The World"	1956	10 —	9 —	— —	Non-LP tracks
"Some Day Soon" "All About Love"	1956	94 —	— —	— —	Non-LP tracks
"I Never Felt This Way Before" "Lullaby In Blue" (with Debbie Reynolds)	1957	— —	— —	— —	Non-LP tracks
"Tonight My Heart Will Be Crying" "Blues For Me"	1957	96 —	— —	— —	Non-LP tracks
"Sunshine Girl" "Did You Close Your Eyes?"	1957	94 —	— —	— —	Non-LP tracks
"Slow Burning Love" "Around The World"	1957	— —	— —	— —	Non-LP tracks
"Sayonara" "That's the Way It Goes"	1957	— —	56; 55	— —	Non-LP tracks
"What's The Use Of Cryin'" "I Don't Hurt Anymore"	1957	— —	43 —	— —	Non-LP tracks
"Kari Waits For Me" "Pick A Partner"	1958	— —	— —	— —	Non-LP tracks
"The Best Thing for You" "Take Me"	1958	— —	— —	— —	Non-LP tracks
"I Am in Love" "Time on My Hands"	1958	— —	— —	— —	Non-LP tracks
"Scent of Mystery" "The Chase"	1959	— —	— —	— —	Music From Michael Todd Jr.'s; Scent Of Mystery

=== 1960 - 1970s ===
List of singles, with selected chart positions, showing other relevant details
Title	Year	Peak chart positions				Album
Title	Year	US Hot 100	US AC	US CB	US Non-Rock	Album
"Summertime Love" "After You've Gone"	1960	— —	— —	— —	— —	Tonight with Eddie Fisher
"Tonight" "Breezin' Along with the Breeze"	1961	44 —	12 —	109 —	— —	Tonight with Eddie Fisher
"Shalom" "Milk And Honey"	1961	— —	— —	105; 104	— —	Non-LP tracks
"Arrivederci Roma" "A Camminare"	1962	112 —	— —	142 —	— —	Non-LP tracks
"Till There Was You" "Another Autumn"	1962	— —	— —	— —	— —	Non-LP tracks
"Back in Your Own Backyard" "The Sweetest Sounds"	1962	— —	— —	— —	— —	Non-LP tracks
"This Nearly Was Mine" "Don't Let It Get You Down"	1963	— —	— —	— —	— —	Non-LP tracks
"Sunrise, Sunset" "Walking In The Footsteps Of A Fool"	1965	119 —	22 —	119 —	— —	Eddie Fisher Today!
"When I Was Young" "Any Time"	1965	— —	— —	— —	— —	When I Was Young
"Young and Foolish" "I Don't Care If the Sun Don't Shine"	1965	— —	25 —	— —	— —	Young and Foolish
"Mary Christmas" "White Christmas"	1965	— —	— —	— —	— —	Mary Christmas
"They Call the Wind Maria" "Great Day"	1966	— —	— —	— —	— —	Young and Foolish
"Unchained Melody" "Old Devil Moon"	1966	— —	— —	— —	— —	Young and Foolish
"Games That Lovers Play" "Mame"	1966	45 —	2 —	41 —	— —	Games That Lovers Play
"People Like You" "Come Love!"	1967	97 —	4 —	74 —	5 —	People Like You
"Now I Know" "I Haven't Got Anything Better to Do"	1967	133 —	23 —	135 —	19 —	Non-LP tracks
"There's A World Full Of Girls (Monica)" "Jerusalem, Jerusalem"	1967	— —	— —	— —	— —	Non-LP tracks
"The Fool on the Hill" "Sunny"	1968	— —	— —	— —	37 —	Non-LP tracks
"Rain In My Heart" "The Way Of A Child"	1968	— —	— —	— —	— —	Non-LP tracks
"I'll Pick A Rose For My Rose" "Lady Mae"	1969	— —	— —	— —	— —	Non-LP tracks
"I Need You Now" "Lady of Spain"	1971	— —	— —	— —	— —	Non-LP tracks
"Wish You Were Here" "Fanny"	1971	— —	— —	— —	— —	Non-LP tracks
