= Young and Foolish (Eddie Fisher album) =

Studio album by Eddie Fisher
- Released: December 1965
- Genre: Traditional pop
- Length: 28:10
- Label: Dot Records
- Producer: Randy Wood

Eddie Fisher chronology
Mary Christmas (1965)	Young and Foolish (1965)	Games That Lovers Play (1966)

Singles from Young and Foolish
- 1. "Young and Foolish" Released: September 1965; 2. "They Call the Wind Maria" Released: January 1966; 3. "Unchained Melody" Released: September 1966

Young and Foolish is a studio album by American singer and actor Eddie Fisher released in late 1965. It became his final recorded album for Dot Records. It contained a total of 12 tracks, including three lead singles. Most of the songs chosen were pop standards from various decades. The album received a positive critical reception following its release, though it missed the US album charts.

== Background, recording and content ==
Eddie Fisher had been a recording artist for RCA Victor since the 1950s, gaining several hits. As his chart performance declined, RCA Victor dropped him. Fisher later signed Dot Records and marked his comeback with Eddie Fisher Today!, under producer Randy Wood. Fisher continued recording with Wood, and in late 1965 Young and Foolish was recorded, with arrangements by Ernie Freeman.

Young and Foolish consisted of 12 tracks in total. Tracks included traditional pop standards like "Unchained Melody," "Old Devil Moon", "Alone Together," and "I'm Old Fashioned". "Let the Rest of the World Go By," "Great Day," and "The Life That I Love" were all similar, but less popular selections. Other songs included "Secret Love," a hit for Doris Day in 1953, "A Cock-Eyed Optimist," from the 1949 musical South Pacific.

== Release and singles ==
Young and Foolish was originally released in December 1965 by Dot Records. It was the twelfth studio album of Fisher's career. The label originally offered it as a vinyl LP, with six songs on "Side A" and six songs on "Side B". It was available both in stereo and mono sound. The album hasn't been digitized onto streaming platforms.

Three lead singles were included on Young and Foolish. The title track "Young and Foolish" written by Albert Hague and Arnold B. Horwitt was first released by Dot as a single in September 1965. The flip was a "I Don't Care If The Sun Don't Shine", included in the album, too. "Young and Foolish" became a top-25 single on Billboard's Easy Listening chart. "They Call the Wind Maria" was issued as a single in January 1966, and "Unchained Melody" was issued in September 1966. Both songs failed to chart.

== Critical reception ==
Professional ratings
Review scores
Source	Rating
Cashbox	Positive (Pop Pick)

The album was given a positive review from Cashbox magazine following its original release. Putting the album in its "Pop" section, the publication stated that Fisher "has captivated audiences formany years, and his latest set is possibly one of his finest efforts. They said that "the polished, rich singing-of Fisher could make this one a biggie with both good music spinners and buyers". Illinois State Register said that Fisher "is singing as good as ever these days", calling the arrangements by Freeman "sparkling".

== Chart performance ==
It entered Cashbox magazine's Looking Ahead Albums chart, which was a continuation of the Top 100 Albums chart, in the issue dated January 1, 1966, peaking at No. 108 during a two-week run on the chart. The album debuted on Record World magazine's LP's Coming Up chart in the issue dated January 8, 1966, peaking at No. 111 during a three-week run.

== Track listing ==
Side one
No.	Title	Writer(s)	Length
1.	"Young and Foolish"	Arnold B. Horwitt; Albert Hague	2:04
2.	"They Call the Wind Maria"	Alan Jay Lerner; Frederick Loewe	2:52
3.	"Unchained Melody"	Hy Zaret; Alex North	2:52
4.	"Let the Rest of the World Go By"	Ernest Ball; J. Keirn Brennan	2:11
5.	"I Don't Care If the Sun Don't Shine"	Mack David	2:04
6.	"Secret Love"	Paul Francis Webster; Sammy Fain	2:49
Total length:			14:52

Side two
No.	Title	Writer(s)	Length
1.	"Great Day"	Vincent Youmans; Billy Rose; Edward Eliscu	2:15
2.	"The Life That I Love"	Edward Samuels; Murray David Schwimmer	1:55
3.	"I'm Old Fashioned"	Jerome Kern; Johnny Mercer	2:07
4.	"Old Devil Moon"	Burton Lane; E. Y. Harburg	2:03
5.	"Alone Together"	Arthur Schwartz; Howard Dietz	3:03
6.	"A Cock-Eyed Optimist"	Richard Rodgers; Oscar Hammerstein II	1:55
Total length:			13:18

== Charts ==
Chart performance for Young and Foolish
Chart (1966)	Peak position
US Cashbox Looking Ahead Albums	108
US Record World LP's Coming Up	111

== Release history ==
Release history and formats for Young and Foolish
Region	Date	Format	Label	Ref.
United States	December 1965	LP (mono, stereo)	Dot Records	
Canada	December 1965	LP (mono, stereo)	Dot Records	

== Personnel ==
All credits are adapted from the liner notes of Young and Foolish.

- Eddie Fisher – lead vocals
- Ernie Freeman – arranger, conductor
- Randy Wood – producer
