= Eddie Fisher at the Winter Garden =

Live album by Eddie Fisher
- Released: January 1963
- Recorded: October 2, 1962
- Venue: Winter Garden
- Genre: vocal; traditional pop
- Length: 1:08:30
- Label: Ramrod/MGM
- Producer: Jim Davis

Eddie Fisher chronology
| Scent of Mystery (1960) | Eddie Fisher at the Winter Garden (1963) | Eddie Fisher Today! (1965) |

Eddie Fisher at the Winter Garden is a live album by American singer Eddie Fisher, recorded in October 1962 and released in early 1963. It gained several positive reviews upon its release, and made a small impression on the Billboard album chart.

== Background ==
After a long break from live performances, Eddie Fisher returned to the stage in May 1962. The first released document of his show was At the Winter Garden, recorded in October of that year. Dick Gregory and Barrie Chase also appeared with Fisher. It was his only live album. It was released under his own Ramrod label, which he made after RCA Victor dropped him due to his waning popularity in the late 1950s.

== Content and release ==
The album, a 2-LP set, was distributed by MGM, after they made a deal with Fisher's Ramrod Productions. Andy Miele, MGM’s director of marketing, got the album released in time for Christmas sales. Comedian Dick Gregory and actress Barrie Chase would also appear with Fisher at the Winter Garden, but their performances wouldn't be added into the album.

The live album includes 19 tracks, such as his minor 1961 hit "Tonight", from West Side Story, and Al Jolson songs like "Sonny Boy" and "Rock-a-Bye Your Baby With a Dixie Melody", both of which were included in his 1968 tribute album to the singer. He sang half of the song "Mack the Knife" in German, and he sang some of the words on the song "Belz" also in German. The album is unusually long, being over an hour long. It was his first album in three years, and was his first and only live album. Only his songs and commentary were included in the album. The album debuted on Billboard magazine's Top LP's chart in the issue dated March 30, 1963, peaking at No. 126 during a three-week run on the chart.

=== Reissue ===
The album was reissued on CD in 1999 by Taragon Records.

== Reception ==
Professional ratings
Review scores
| Source | Rating |
|---|---|
| AllMusic | 4/5 stars |
| The Encyclopedia of Popular Music | 2/5 stars |
| Billboard | Positive |
| Cashbox | Positive |

=== National reception ===
The album received a positive critical reception upon its release. Billboard magazine believed that "This one's bound to click with Fisher's fans, and with matrons who look upon Fisher as My Son, the Pop Singer. It's a live recording made last fall at New York's Winter Garden containing virtually everything in the two record-set from Jolson's songs to Fisher oldies like "Anytime". The magazine also noted that the best track from the album was "What Kind of Fool Am I?". Casbox reviewed the album writing, "Eddie Fisher’s triumph at Gotham’s Winter Garden is perfectly captured on this delightful two disk set cut live during the chanter’s engagement at the theater last year. With Eddy Samuels providing the musical backing, Fisher displays a mature, polished, professional delivery on a top flight group of standards," noting that the best listening bets would include “This Nearly Was Mine,” “Sitting On Top Of The World” and his 50s hit “Wish You Were Here.” The retrospective by John Bush on AllMusic said "Fisher's voice is solid as he tackles a varied repertoire including old-guard standards as well as contemporary material," noting "The remastering is only fair -- there's some hiss low in the mix -- but fans will delight at the hour's worth of prime Eddie Fisher."

=== New York City reception ===
Many New York newspapers commented on the album, for example: music critic Howard Taubman of the New York Times commented, “Fisher pours it on. Showmanship, rhythm, fervor. A thorough professional. Belts out tunes like a home-run slugger.” Norman Nadel of the New York World Telegram and Sun added, “Eddie’s voice has developed more body and richer timbre in the lower register. He sang the familiar songs in a slam-bang style.” John Chapman of the New York Daily News described Fisher as “a charming, modest, earnest young chap who is a good singer of popular songs.”

== Track listing ==
Eddie Fisher at the Winter Garden track listing:

Side one
| No. | Title | Length |
|---|---|---|
| 1. | "Overture" | 2:39 |
| 2. | "Don't Let It Get You Down" | 2:10 |
| 3. | "Back in Your Own Backyard" | 2:05 |
| 4. | "Tonight / Maria / Something's Coming" (from West Side Story) | 5:23 |
| 5. | "You Made Me Love You (I Didn't Want to Do It)" | 2:06 |
| 6. | "Never on Sunday" | 3:43 |

Side two
| No. | Title | Length |
|---|---|---|
| 7. | "This Nearly Was Mine" (from South Pacific) | 2:08 |
| 8. | "Mack the Knife" | 3:50 |
| 9. | "Hava Nagila" | 4:54 |
| 10. | "Moon River" (from Breakfast at Tiffany's) | 2:12 |
| 11. | "Swanee / A Quarter to Nine / Liza / Sitting on Top of the World / Toot, Toot, Tootsie!" | 4:31 |
| 12. | "April Showers / Robert E. Lee" | 1:48 |
| 13. | "Rock-a-Bye Your Baby with a Dixie Melody" | 3:40 |

Side three
| No. | Title | Length |
|---|---|---|
| 14. | "Sonny Boy" | 3:54 |
| 15. | "Makin' Whoopee" | 2:33 |
| 16. | "Anytime / I Need You Now / Wish You Were Here / Heart / Oh! My Papa" | 7:51 |

Side four
| No. | Title | Length |
|---|---|---|
| 17. | "What Kind of Fool Am I?" | 3:35 |
| 18. | "Belz (That Wonderful Girl of Mine)" | 4:05 |
| 19. | "The Sweetest Sounds" (Richard Rodgers) | 5:23 |

== Charts ==
Chart peaks for Eddie Fisher at the Winter Garden
| Chart (1963) | Peak position |
|---|---|
| US Billboard Top LPs | 126 |
