= I Love You (Eddie Fisher album) =

Studio album by Eddie Fisher
- Released: 1955
- Genre: Traditional pop, vocal
- Length: 32:41
- Label: RCA Victor; LPM 1097

Eddie Fisher chronology
May I Sing to You? (1954)	I Love You (1955)	Eddie Fisher Sings Academy Award Winning Songs (1955)

I Love You is a studio album by American singer Eddie Fisher, released in early 1955.

== Background ==
By 1955 Eddie Fisher was at the peak of his career; he just had some big hits in 1955, plus a number-one hit song the previous year and a number 4 album as well.

== Overview ==
Recorded and released in early 1955, the album consists as the title suggests, of love songs. Eight out of the twelve songs have the word "love" in them. The album, as the one before, was successful, reaching No. 8 on Billboard magazine's Best-Selling Pop LP's chart, and peaked at No. 10 on the Cashbox Top 15 Best-Selling Albums chart. The album became a bestseller. This was Fisher's last charting studio album for the next decade, until he released Eddie Fisher Today! in 1965. Subsequently another album featuring older standards was released, but it wouldn't chart nor be considered successful.

== Reception ==
William Ruhlman of AllMusic believed that, Hugo Winterhalter was RCA Victor's answer to Capitol's Nelson Riddle, and Decca's Gordon Jenkins, and that "he whipped up contemporary arrangements that boasted sprightly rhythms, swirling strings, and the oohing and aching of a vocal chorus here and there." Ruhlman added "Fisher tended to approach every song the same way, taking a lyric and throttling it to within an inch of its life. He could be more delicate ('The Girl That I Marry') and even playful ('I Can't Give You Anything but Love') when given a chance, but he and Winterhalter had forged a formula they were for the most part unwilling to vary".

== Track listing ==
Side one
No.	Title	Writer(s)	Length
1.	"So in Love"	Cole Porter	3:18
2.	"Pretty Baby"	Tony Jackson, Gus Kahn, Egbert Van Alstyne	2:15
3.	"My One and Only Love"	Robert Mellin, Guy Wood	2:51
4.	"I Can't Give You Anything but Love"	Dorothy Fields, Jimmy McHugh	2:14
5.	"The Girl That I Marry"	Irving Berlin	2:43
6.	"I Surrender, Dear"	Harry Barris, Gordon Clifford	3:26

Side two
No.	Title	Writer(s)	Length
7.	"What Is This Thing Called Love?"	Cole Porter	2:39
8.	"Let's Fall in Love"	Harold Arlen, Ted Koehler	2:18
9.	"My Romance"	Lorenz Hart, Richard Rodgers	2:48
10.	"Love Somebody"	Alex Kramer, Joan Whitney	2:55
11.	"Love Sends a Little Gift of Roses"	Leslie Cook, John Openshaw	2:44
12.	"Somebody Loves Me"	Buddy DeSylva, George Gershwin, Ballard MacDonald	02:12
Total length:			32:31

== Charts ==
Weekly chart peaks for I Love You
Chart (1955)	Peak position
US Billboard Best-Selling Pop LP's	8
US Cashbox Top 15 Best-Selling Albums	10
