= Everything I Have Is Yours (song) =

1933 popular song by Burton Lane & Harold Adamson

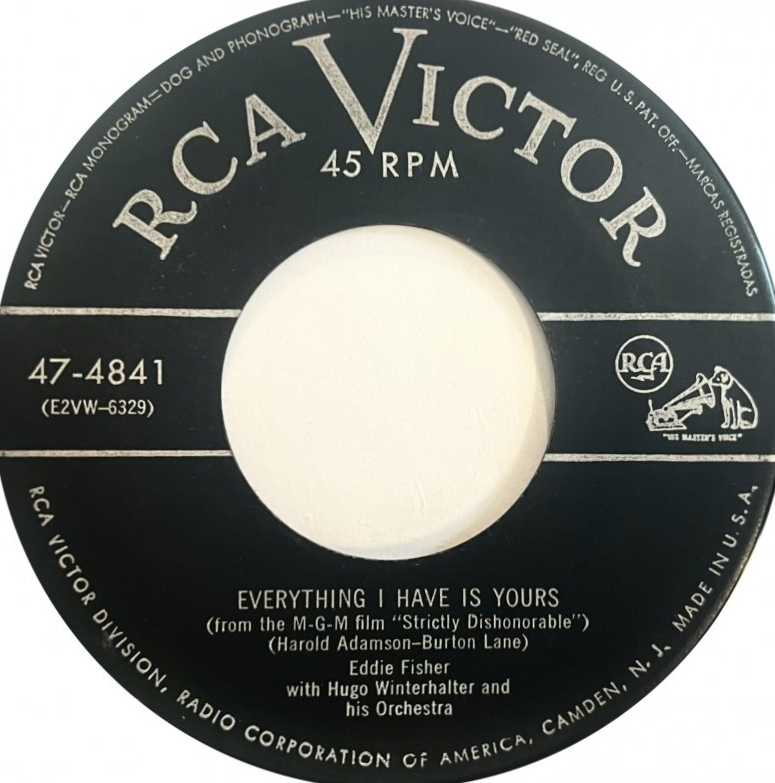

Single by Eddie Fisher

from the album I'm in the Mood for Love
- B-side: "You'll Never Know"
- Released: 1952
- Genre: Vocal Pop
- Label: RCA Victor

Eddie Fisher singles chronology
"Outside of Heaven" (1952)	"Everything I Have Is Yours" (1952)	"Christmas Day" (1952)

"Everything I Have Is Yours" is a popular song composed by Burton Lane with lyrics by Harold Adamson. The song was published in 1933 and was first sung by Art Jarrett in the 1933 film Dancing Lady.

It also served as the title song of a 1952 musical film, not otherwise related to Dancing Lady, in which it was sung by Monica Lewis.

== Recordings ==
- George Olsen and His Orchestra – recorded August 18, 1933, for Columbia Records (catalog No. 2842)
- Rudy Vallee and His Connecticut Yankees – a hit record in 1934
- Al Bowlly – recorded January 4, 1934 (Al Bowlly discography)
- Roy Fox and His Orchestra (vocal by Denny Dennis) (1934).
- Martha Tilton (1944).
- Billy Eckstine - recorded May 20, 1947, and a minor hit in 1948. Later included in Everything I Have Is Yours: The Best of the M.G.M. Years (1991)
- Eddie Fisher - a minor hit in 1952 when it reached the No. 23 spot in the Billboard chart, but was more successful in the UK, peaking at No. 8.
- Billie Holiday - recorded in April 1952. Another version recorded on August 25, 1955, with Jimmy Rowles, piano and Barney Kessel guitar, from Velvet Mood, Clef Records (1956)
- Patti Page - Music for Two in Love (1956)
- Matt Monro (1957) - eventually included in the album Matt Uncovered - The Rarer Monro (2012).
- Shirley Bassey - from her LP Let's Face the Music with Nelson Riddle and his Orchestra (1962)
- Julie London – Nice Girls Don't Stay for Breakfast (1967)
