= Games That Lovers Play (song) =

1966 song by Eddie Fisher

Single by Eddie Fisher

from the album Games That Lovers Play
- B-side: "Mame"
- Released: September 1966
- Recorded: 1966
- Genre: Vocal pop, easy listening
- Label: RCA
- Songwriters: Eddie Snyder, James Last, Larry Kusik, Rudolf Gunter-Loose
- Producer: Al Schmitt

Eddie Fisher singles chronology
"Young and Foolish" (1965)	"Games That Lovers Play" (1966)	"People Like You" (1967)

"Games That Lovers Play"

Single by Wayne Newton
- B-side: "Half a World Away"
- Released: October 1966
- Recorded: 1966
- Genre: Easy listening
- Label: MGM
- Songwriters: Eddie Snyder, James Last, Larry Kusik, Rudolf Gunter-Loose

Wayne Newton singles chronology
"Remember When" (1965)	"Games That Lovers Play" (1966)	"Dreams of the Everyday Housewife" (1968)

"Games That Lovers Play"

Single by Connie Francis
- B-side: "Spanish Nights and You"
- Released: October 1966
- Recorded: 1966
- Genre: Easy listening
- Label: MGM
- Songwriters: Eddie Snyder, James Last, Larry Kusik, Rudolf Gunter-Loose

Connie Francis singles chronology
"So Nice (Summer Samba)" (1966)	"Games That Lovers Play" (1966)	"No Letter Today" (1967)

"Games That Lovers Play" is a popular song composed by James Last which became a hit for multiple artists in 1966 and 1967. The song has been recorded more than 100 times. Last's own version was included on his 1967 album Games That Lovers Play.

== Eddie Fisher's version ==
=== Background ===
By 1966, Eddie Fisher's sales and chart performance of singles and albums had waned. RCA Victor Records had dropped him at the start of the decade, and Fisher created his own record label named Ramrod Records. It had seen only one successful release with a live album. In early 1965, he signed Dot Records, with whom his first release was scheduled to be the single "Sunrise, Sunset", from Fiddler on the Roof. The song was heavily promoted, but it had charted only in the US, reaching No. 119 on the Billboard Hot 100 and the Cashbox Top 100 Singles charts, marking a return to them. The Dot contract had only produced one successful LP, which prompted Fisher to leave the label by late 1966, and he reunited with RCA right after.

=== Release and reception ===
In September 1966, he recorded the song "Games That Lovers Play" (arranged by Nelson Riddle, produced by Al Schmitt), released by RCA Victor Records. It was backed by the swinging title track from Mame. The single had already sold 150,000 copies in ten days, with RCA putting their all their substantial promotional power behind it. Following the immense success, Fisher recorded the album Games That Lovers Play (also arranged by Nelson Riddle) which was a commercial and critical hit.

The single received a positive critical reception upon its release. Billboard noted that "The hit German ballad with English lyrics could do for Fisher what "Strangers in the Night" did for Sinatra," Adding that "His return to RCA with a Nelson Riddle arrangement should put him back on the Hot 100 once again. Cashbox said that "Vet songster returns to the Victor fold with a breezy swinger", describing the song as a "smart German tune", and noting that "Eddie's sure to come up with good-sized airtime & jukebox exposure." Record World magazine put the single in its "Sleepers of the Week" section at the start, and positively stated that "Eddie Fisher will score once more with RCA and this strong ballad – just the thing in these days." The magazine described Fisher as "never better"."

=== Chart performance ===
"Games That Lovers Play" debuted on Billboard magazine's Easy Listening chart in the issue dated October 15, 1966, and peaked at No. 2 during a fourteen-week run on it. The single had seen pop success as well, reaching No. 45 on the Billboard Hot 100 and No. 41 on the Cashbox Top 100 Singles charts, marking a return to them. It became an international hit as well, reaching the Canadian and South African charts soon after too.

== Cover versions ==
Renditions by Wayne Newton and Mantovani charted concurrently in late 1966 in the United States. The latter returned to the pop charts with the song, while Newton's version peaked at No. 22 on the Easy Listening chart. In early 1967, "Games That Lovers Play" became a hit for Donald Peers in the United Kingdom and Connie Francis in South Africa, where it reached the top 20.

== Chart history ==
Eddie Fisher
Chart (1966)	Peak position
Canada RPM Top Singles	52
South Africa (Springbok)	20
U.S. Billboard Hot 100	45
U.S. Billboard Easy Listening	2
U.S. Cash Box Top 100 Singles	41

Wayne Newton
Chart (1966)	Peak position
U.S. Billboard Hot 100	86
U.S. Billboard Easy Listening	22
U.S. Cash Box Top 100 Singles	97

Mantovani and His Orchestra
Chart (1966)	Peak position
U.S. Billboard Bubbling Under the Hot 100	122
U.S. Cash Box Top 100 Singles	93
U.S. Record World 100 Top Pops	80

Donald Peers
Chart (1966–1967)	Peak position
UK Singles Chart (OCC)	46

Connie Francis
Chart (1966–1967)	Peak position
South Africa (Springbok)	17

== Bibliography ==
- Downey, Pat (1994). Cash box pop singles charts, 1950-1993. Englewood, Colo.: Libraries Unlimited. pp. 120–121. ISBN 1-56308-316-7.
- Fisher, Eddie; Fisher, David (July 15, 2000). Been There, Done That. Macmillan. ISBN 978-0-312-97558-6.
- Whitburn, Joel (1973). "Joel Whitburn's Top LP's, 1945-1972". Record Research.
- Whitburn, Joel (2002). Joel Whitburn's top pop singles 1955-2002. Menomonee Falls, Wisc.: Record Research. p. 244. ISBN 0898201551.
- Whitburn, Joel (2007). Joel Whitburn presents Billboard top adult songs, 1961-2006: chart data compiled from Billboard's adult contemporary charts, 1961-2006, and adult top 40 charts, 1996-2006. Menomonee Falls, Wis: Record Research Inc. ISBN 978-0-89820-169-7.
- Hoffmann, Frank W. (1988). "The Cash box album charts, 1955-1974". Archive.org. Metuchen, N.J. : Scarecrow Press.
- Larkin, Colin (2007). "The Encyclopedia of Popular Music". Omnibus Press. p. 535. ISBN 9781846098567.
