= Mary Christmas (album) =

Studio album by Eddie Fisher
- Released: Late 1965
- Genres: Vocal pop, holiday
- Length: 31:35
- Language: English
- Label: Dot Records
- Producer: Randy Wood

Eddie Fisher chronology
When I Was Young (1965)	Mary Christmas (1965)	Young and Foolish (1965)

Professional ratings
Review scores
Source	Rating
AllMusic	2.5/5 stars
The Encyclopedia of Popular Music	3/5 stars

Mary Christmas is a holiday studio album by American pop singer Eddie Fisher, released in 1965 by Dot Records. It was his second holiday album, and though his first Christmas album was a big success, after 11 years, some sales were maintained.

== Overview ==
This was the third of four albums that Eddie Fisher recorded and released in 1965. It came after the release of his single "Mary Christmas", which didn't chart. The album entered Cashbox magazine's Looking Ahead Albums chart, which was a continuation of the Top 100 Albums chart, in the issue dated December 25, 1965, peaking at No. 131 during a one-week run on the chart.

This album was recorded during a slowdown in Fisher's career, in which his songs and albums sold and charted less, and whilst most albums were failures, although 1965 was different, because his first album of the year, Eddie Fisher Today! charted quite well, so Dot Records rushed another one, and later a Christmas themed one. This Christmas album didn't help Fisher return to the charts. It includes Fisher's renditions of several Christmas standards as well as the title track "Mary Christmas", an original holiday ballad.

Immediately after Christmas Dot Records would roll out his next album Young and Foolish, which got some positive reviews.

== Track listing ==
Side one
No.	Title	Writer(s)	Length
1.	"Mary Christmas"	Eddy Samuels, R. Freed	2:46
2.	"White Christmas"	Irving Berlin	2:38
3.	"Santa Claus Is Comin' to Town"	J. Fred Coots, Haven Gillespie	2:22
4.	"My Favorite Things"	Richard Rodgers, Oscar Hammerstein II	2:17
5.	"Have Yourself a Merry Little Christmas"	Hugh Martin, Ralph Blane	2:40
6.	"Silver Bells"	Jay Livingston, Ray Evans	2:47

Side two
No.	Title	Writer(s)	Length
7.	"The Little Drummer Boy"	Katherine Kennicott Davis, Henry Onorati, Harry Simeone	2:28
8.	"O Holy Night"	Adolphe Adam, Placide Cappeau	2:19
9.	"Ave Maria"	Franz Schubert	2:36
10.	"Do You Hear What I Hear?"	Noël Regney, Gloria Shayne Baker	2:59
11.	"Silent Night"	Franz Xaver Gruber, Joseph Mohr	2:41
12.	"Lullaby for Christmas Eve"	Paul Francis Webster, Peter King	2:56
Total length:			31:35

== Charts ==
Chart performance for Mary Christmas
Chart (1965)	Peak position
US Cashbox Looking Ahead Albums	131

== Personnel ==
All credits are adapted from the liner notes of Mary Christmas.

- Eddie Fisher – lead vocals
- Randy Wood – producer
- Pete King – arranger, conductor
- Sandy Dvore – drawing
