= May I Sing to You? =

Studio album by Eddie Fisher
- Released: January 1954
- Genre: Traditional pop; vocal
- Length: 25:46
- Label: RCA Victor Records

Eddie Fisher chronology
Eddie Fisher Sings Irving Berlin Favorites (1953)	May I Sing to You? (1954)	I Love You (1955)

Alternative cover
- 1956 US reissue cover

May I Sing to You? (Eddie Fisher Salutes some of the Great Singers of Our Time) is a studio album by American singer and actor Eddie Fisher released in early 1954. It became his fifth album for RCA Victor Records. It contained a total of 8 tracks: 7 tributes to popular singers of his time, and an original ending track. The album received a positive contemporary and retrospective critical reception. May I Sing to You? was a commercial success as well, reaching the US top-10 on the LP and EP charts published by Billboard magazine.

== Background, recording and content ==
Eddie Fisher had been a recording artist for RCA Victor since the late 1940s, breaking out with "Thinking of You" in 1950. By 1952, RCA started to issue 10-inch LPs of Fisher's material. Fisher quickly gained several more hits and by 1954 had three number-one singles. For 1954, a concept album was recorded, with Fisher offering a "unique tribute to professionals before him", as stated in the liner notes of the LP.

May I Sing to You? consisted of 8 tracks in total. The title track was an Eddie Fisher original, while 7 other tracks were tributes. "April Showers" to Al Jolson, "I'm Just a Vagabond Lover" to Rudy Vallée, "You Call It Madness (But I Call It Love)" to Russ Columbo, "Where the Blue of the Night (Meets the Gold of the Day)" to Bing Crosby, "Night and Day" to Frank Sinatra, "Nature Boy" to Nat King Cole, and "Begin the Beguine" to Tony Martin.

== Release ==
May I Sing to You? was originally released in January 1954 by RCA Victor along with three other Victor vocal albums, (I Believe, That Bad Eartha, and Ames Brothers), with heavy promotion behind all four by the label. It was the fifth studio album of Fisher's career. The label originally offered it as a 10-inch LP, with 4 songs each on "Side A" and "Side B", and as an extended play (EP) with 2 songs each on "Side A", "Side B", "Side C", and "Side D". It was available in mono sound. The album hasn't been digitized onto streaming platforms.

== Critical reception ==
Professional ratings
Review scores
Source	Rating
AllMusic	3/5 stars
The Encyclopedia of Popular Music	3/5 stars
Billboard	88/100 ("Excellent")
Cashbox	Positive ("Sensational")

=== Contemporary reception ===
The album was given a positive review from Cashbox magazine following its original release. They said that "Eddie Fisher salutes some of the great vocalists of our time who have introduced or helped make hits of some of our present day favorites", adding that "Sensational is the rating of this album. The tunes, arrangements, and delivery all rate this adjective," and noting that "Dealers oughta hop on this one immediately". Billboard rated the album 88 points out of 100, which meant the album was "excellent" compared to other vocal albums. They believed that "Since the tunes associated with each artist have proven successful, Fisher isn't gambling with the material."

=== Retrospective reviews ===
William Ruhlmann on AllMusic stated that "With Hugo Winterhalter's lively arrangements, Fisher turned in competent versions of the signature songs of his elders without imitating them," and believed "But by taking on numbers that had been performed definitively by others, he gave himself an insurmountable challenge; you couldn't hear 'Where the Blue of the Night Meets the Gold of the Day' and not think of Crosby or 'Nature Boy' and not think of Nat "King" Cole. Other singers avoided these songs for a reason." The Encyclopedia of Popular Music gave the album a three-star rating, meaning that the album was "good" by the artist's standards and "recommended".

== Chart performance ==
The album debuted on Billboard magazine's Best Selling Popular LP's chart in the issue dated January 30, 1954, peaking at No. 4 during a twelve-week run on the chart. In the February 13 issue, the EP version of the album climbed to No. 2 on the Billboard Best Selling Popular EP's chart.

== Track listing ==
LPM 3185: Side one
No.	Title	Writer(s)	Length
1.	"April Showers"	Buddy DeSylva; Louis Silvers	4:22
2.	"I'm Just a Vagabond Lover"	Rudy Vallée; Leonard Zimmerman	2:21
3.	"You Call It Madness (But I Call It Love)"	Russ Columbo; Con Conrad; Alain Dubois; Paul Gregory	3:15
4.	"Where the Blue of the Night (Meets the Gold of the Day)"	Fred E. Ahlert; Bing Crosby; Roy Turk	3:00

LPM 3185: Side two
No.	Title	Writer(s)	Length
5.	"Night and Day"	Cole Porter	3:12
6.	"Nature Boy"	Eden Ahbez	3:11
7.	"Begin the Beguine"	Cole Porter	3:49
8.	"May I Sing to You?"	Harry Akst; Eddie Fisher; Charles Tobias	2:36
Total length:			25:46

== Charts ==
Chart performance for May I Sing to You?
Chart (1954)	Peak position
US Billboard Best Selling Popular LP's	4
US Billboard Best Selling Popular EP's	2

== Release history ==
Release history and formats for May I Sing to You?
Region	Date	Format	Label	Ref.
United States	January 1954	10-inch LP	RCA Victor	
Canada	January 1954	10-inch LP	RCA Victor	
United States	January 1954	Extended play (EP)	RCA Victor	
United States	Early 1956	12-inch LP	RCA Victor	

== Personnel ==
All credits are adapted from the liner notes of May I Sing to You?.

- Eddie Fisher – lead vocals
- Hugo Winterhalter – arranger, conductor
- Hugo Winterhalter and His Orchestra – orchestra
