= People Like You (song) =

Single by Eddie Fisher

from the album People Like You
- B-side: "Come Love!"
- Released: January 1967
- Recorded: 1966
- Genre: Traditional pop; easy Listening
- Length: A-side - 2:13; B-side – 3:21
- Label: RCA Victor; 47-9070
- Songwriters: Larry Kusik; Eddie Snyder
- Producer: Al Schmitt

Eddie Fisher singles chronology
"Games That Lovers Play" (1966)	"People Like You" (1967)	"Now I Know" (1967)

"People Like You" was released as a lead single in January 1967, backed by Nelson Riddle's arrangements, and became Eddie Fisher's final entry on the Billboard Hot 100. The song was written by Eddie Snyder and Larry Kusik, and the recording session was produced by Al Schmitt.

== Background ==
In 1966 Fisher came back to the charts with his hit single "Games That Lovers Play" written by Eddie Snyder and Larry Kusik, which peaked at No. 2 on the US Billboard Easy Listening chart. After the success RCA Victor quickly started rushing out his next single, with it being written by the same writers.

== Release and chart performance ==
"People Like You" was released as a seven-inch single in January 1967 by RCA Victor Records. It was backed by a slower-paced song, "Come Love!" on the B-side. The picture taken for the single cover was cropped from his Games That Lovers Play album's cover, showing the rushed-nature of the single.

The single debuted on the Billboard Easy Listening chart on the 28th of January that year, and peaked at No. 4 almost a month later. It also reached No. 97 on the Billboard Hot 100, in which it stayed for 3 weeks. On Cash Box's Top 100 chart, it peaked at No. 74 during a 6-week stay. On Record World's Top 100 Pops it peaked at No. 61, and on their newly created Top Non-Rock chart "People Like You" debuted at No. 23 and peaked at No. 5 after a month and a half. The single got No. 36 in the year-end charts of the AC chart in 1967. It was his last major hit, with the last minor hit being recorded the same year.

== Reception ==
The single was received with positive reviews upon its release. Billboard called it a strong follow up to his hit "Games That Lovers Play" and noted that Eddie's TV appearances and smash in-person performances will make the single as hot as "Games". Cashbox described the song as a "light, bouncy, lilting romancer" and noted that "The slower-paced invitation on the flip is another tune bearing close watching." Record World magazine put the single in its "Singles of the Week" section at the start, and positively stated that "'People Like You' finds Eddie at the top of his form. You can tell he enjoyed recording it, and people like us enjoy listening to it." Later, William Ruhlmann would comment on AllMusic that ""People Like You" sounded like something Dean Martin should be doing".

== Aftermath ==
Like with the album before, Fisher immediately started to record his next album after the charting song, and also like the album before the album is named the same as the song. In the end, "People Like You" continued Fisher's comeback to the charts, but the single and the later released album slowed the comeback.

== Charts ==
=== Weekly charts ===
Chart (1967)	Peak position
US Billboard Hot 100	97
US Billboard Easy Listening	4
US Cashbox Top 100 Singles	74
US Record World 100 Top Pops	61
US Record World Top Non-Rock	5

=== Year-end charts ===
Chart (1967)	Final rank
US Easy Listening	36
