= Eddie Fisher =

American singer and actor (1928–2010)

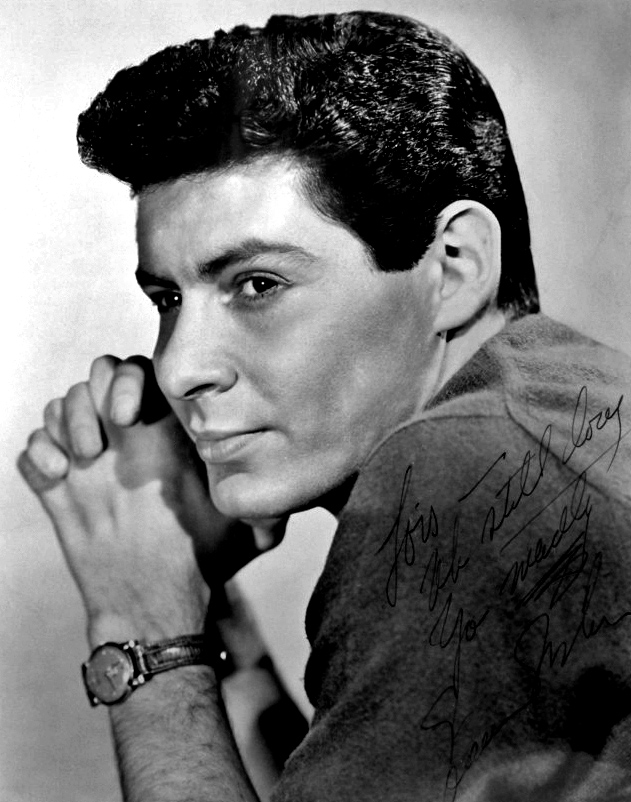
- Fisher in 1960
- Born: Edwin Jack Fisher; August 10, 1928; Philadelphia, Pennsylvania, U.S.
- Died: September 22, 2010 (aged 82); Berkeley, California, U.S.
- Resting place: Cypress Lawn Memorial Park
- Occupations: Singer; actor
- Years active: 1948–2010
- Spouses: Debbie Reynolds (m. 1955; div. 1959); Elizabeth Taylor (m. 1959; div. 1964); Connie Stevens (m. 1967; div. 1969); Terry Richard (m. 1975; div. 1976); Betty Lin (m. 1993; died 2001)
- Children: Carrie; Todd; Joely; Tricia Leigh
- Relatives: Billie Lourd (granddaughter)
- Musical career
- Genres: Traditional pop; Adult contemporary
- Labels: RCA Victor; Ramrod; Dot Records; Musicor Records

Edwin Jack "Eddie" Fisher (August 10, 1928 – September 22, 2010) was an American singer and actor. Popular during the 1950s, he sold millions of records and hosted his own TV show, The Eddie Fisher Show. Fisher had multiple high-profile marriages, including with Debbie Reynolds, Elizabeth Taylor, and Connie Stevens.

== Early life ==
Fisher was born in Philadelphia, Pennsylvania, on August 10, 1928, the fourth of seven children born to Gitte Kathrine "Kate" (née Minicker; c.1901–1991) and Joseph Fisher (né Tisch; 1900–1972), both Ashkenazi Jewish immigrants from the Russian Empire. His father's surname was originally Tisch but was changed to Fisher by the time of the 1940 census. To his family Fisher was always called Sonny Boy, a nickname derived from the song of the same name in Al Jolson's film The Singing Fool (1928). His siblings were Sidney, Nettie, Miriam, Janet, Alvin, and Eileen. Kate and Joseph divorced after 33 years of marriage when Fisher was an adult.

Fisher attended Thomas Junior High School, South Philadelphia High School, and Simon Gratz High School. It was known at an early age that he had talent as a vocalist, and he started singing in numerous amateur contests, which he usually won. He made his radio debut on WFIL, a local Philadelphia radio station. He also performed on Arthur Godfrey's Talent Scouts, a popular radio show that later moved to television. Because he became a local star, Fisher dropped out of high school in the middle of his senior year to pursue his career.

== Career ==
=== 1946–1950: Early beginnings ===
By 1946 Fisher was crooning with the bands of Buddy Morrow and Charlie Ventura. He was heard in 1949 by Eddie Cantor at Grossinger's Catskill Resort Hotel in the Borscht Belt. Cantor's so-called discovery of Fisher was later described as a totally contrived, "manipulated" arrangement by Milton Blackstone, Grossinger's publicity director.

After performing on Cantor's radio show he was an instant hit and gained nationwide exposure. He then signed a recording contract with RCA Victor and became their best-selling pop artist.

=== 1951–1959: American singing star ===
Fisher was drafted into the U.S. Army in 1951, sent to Fort Hood, Texas, for basic training, and served a year in Korea. From 1952 to 1953 he was the official vocal soloist for the United States Army Band (Pershing's Own) and a tenor section member in the United States Army Band Chorus (an element of Pershing's Own) assigned at Fort Myer in the Washington, D.C. Military District. During his active duty period he also made occasional guest television appearances in uniform, introduced as "PFC Eddie Fisher". After his discharge he began to sing in top nightclubs and had a variety television series, Coke Time with Eddie Fisher on NBC (1953–1957). Fisher also appeared on The Perry Como Show, Club Oasis, The Martha Raye Show, The Gisele MacKenzie Show, The Chesterfield Supper Club, and The George Gobel Show, and he starred in another series, The Eddie Fisher Show (NBC) (1957–1959, alternating with Gobel's series).

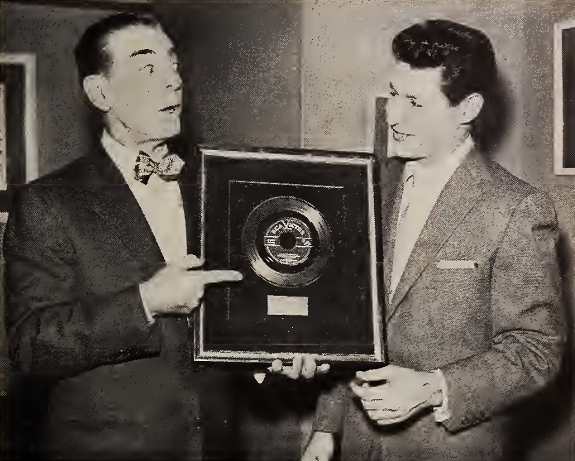
Eddie Cantor handing Eddie Fisher a gold record for Fisher's single "Oh! My Pa-Pa" on January 6, 1954.

Fisher's good looks and strong, melodious tenor voice made him a teen idol and one of the most popular singers of the early 1950s. He had 17 songs in the Top 10 between 1950 and 1956 and 35 in the Top 40. In 1953 "Any Time" became his first record to sell a million copies, followed soon after by "I'm Walking Behind You". That year "Wish You Were Here" topped the U.S. pop charts as well, and another million-seller "Oh! My Pa-Pa" was released. The latter also set an all-time record at that time for RCA Victor; "Oh! My Pa-Pa" sold over 250,000 copies in one week. In 1954 Fisher topped the U.S. charts a fourth time with "I Need You Now", which also hit the UK charts at number 13. When Fisher was at the height of his popularity in the mid-1950s, singles, rather than albums, were the primary medium for issuing recordings. However, Fisher had several Top-10 albums as well. Eddie Fisher Sings, I'm in the Mood for Love, Christmas with Eddie Fisher, and May I Sing to You? all scored within the pop Top 5, featuring both original material and cover songs. In 1957 he signed a then-record $1 million deal with the newly opened Tropicana Las Vegas to appear for at least four weeks a year for five years.

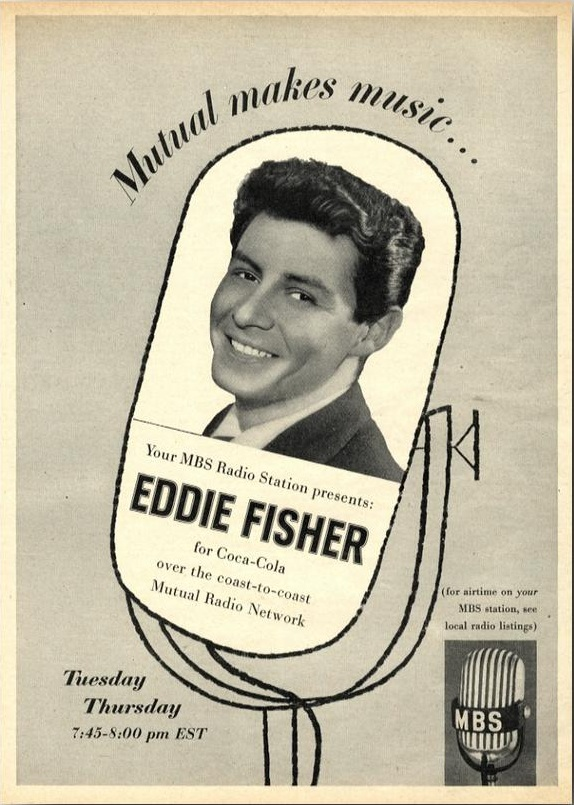
Newspaper advertisement for Eddie Fisher's radio show on the Mutual Broadcasting System in 1954.

In his memoir, My Life, My Loves, Fisher recounted turning down a Copacabana engagement that a young tenor named Bill Shirley later accepted, whose successful debut Fisher witnessed from backstage. Fisher recalled Monte Proser telling him, “That could have been you,” a moment he described with lingering regret. In 1954, following growing media attention on Shirley’s relationship with Debbie Reynolds, Fisher re-entered Reynolds’ life with the support of his public relations team. His sudden proposal at the Cocoanut Grove shifted public attention and led to Reynolds’ engagement, effectively ending her relationship with Shirley. While Fisher did not reference Shirley directly, the timing and tone of his memoir suggest a desire to reassert his presence both personally and professionally.

Fisher created interest as a pop culture icon. Betty Johnson's "I Want Eddie Fisher For Christmas", containing references to a number of hit songs, reached No. 28 in the Music Vendor national survey during an 11-week chart run in late 1954.

In 1956, Fisher costarred with then-wife Debbie Reynolds in the musical comedy Bundle of Joy. He played a dramatic role in the 1960 drama BUtterfield 8 with second wife Elizabeth Taylor. His best friend was a showman and producer Mike Todd, who died in a plane crash in 1958. Fisher's affair, divorce from Reynolds, and subsequent marriage to Taylor, Todd's widow, caused a show business scandal. Due to the unfavorable publicity surrounding the affair and divorce, NBC canceled Fisher's television series in March 1959.

=== 1960–1969: Decline and eventual comeback with "Games That Lovers Play" ===
In 1960, RCA Victor dropped him due to declining sales, and he briefly recorded on his own label, Ramrod Records. It had seen only one modestly successful release with a live album. In early 1965, he signed Dot Records, with whom his first release was scheduled to be the single "Sunrise, Sunset", from Fiddler on the Roof. The song was heavily promoted, with Dot buying out advertisements and Fisher performing it on multiple shows, notably The Ed Sullivan Show. It had bubbled under the pop charts and also peaked at number 22 on the Easy Listening charts. This technically counts as the biggest standard Fisher can claim credit for introducing, although it is rarely associated with him. The Dot album Eddie Fisher Today! saw Fisher return to recording a full LP for the first time in three years. It became his first charting studio album in 10 years, peaking at number 52 nationally. Aside from Eddie Fisher Today!, the Dot contract was not successful in record sales terms. The only other recording by Fisher to get any traction during this time was "Young and Foolish", which became the title track for his next Dot album in December 1965.

He returned to RCA Victor and had a single hit in 1966 with the song "Games That Lovers Play" with Nelson Riddle, which became the title of his best-selling album. The single had already sold 150,000 copies in ten days, and eventually peaked at number 2 on the Billboard Easy Listening while also coming close to the reaching the pop top-40. The follow-up single "People Like You" became his final big hit, reaching number 4 on the Billboard Easy Listening chart in early 1967. His last album for RCA Victor was an Al Jolson tribute, You Ain't Heard Nothin' Yet, released in 1968. Fisher dissatisfied with RCA Victor's lack of promotion of the album, left the label. His final single came in 1969 with Marv Johnson's pop hit "I'll Pick a Rose for My Rose", released by Musicor Records. The song was noted by critics as to giving Fisher a "younger pop sound" than in his previous releases. The song barely made the Record World pop charts at number 140, acting as his final charting release as well.

=== 1970–2005: Later career and performances ===
In 1983, he attempted a comeback tour, but it was unsuccessful. Fisher's last released album was recorded around 1984 on the Bainbridge record label. Fisher tried to stop the album from being released, but it turned up as After All. The album was produced by William J. O'Malley and arranged by Angelo DiPippo. DiPippo, a world-renowned arranger, worked with Eddie for countless hours to better his vocals, but it became futile. Fisher's final recordings (never released) were made in 1995 with the London Philharmonic Orchestra. According to arranger-conductor Vincent Falcone, writing in his 2005 autobiography, Frankly: Just Between Us, these tracks were "the best singing of his life".

Fisher performed in top concert halls all over the United States and headlined in major Las Vegas showrooms. He headlined at the Palace Theater in New York City, as well as London's Palladium. In the culmination of his return to the concert stage in 1962, Fisher headlined a five-week Broadway show at the Winter Garden, calling it a dream of his since his youth to perform in the venue Al Jolson had made famous.

Fisher has two stars on the Hollywood Walk of Fame: one for recording, at 6241 Hollywood Boulevard, and one for television, at 1724 Vine Street.

== Personal life ==
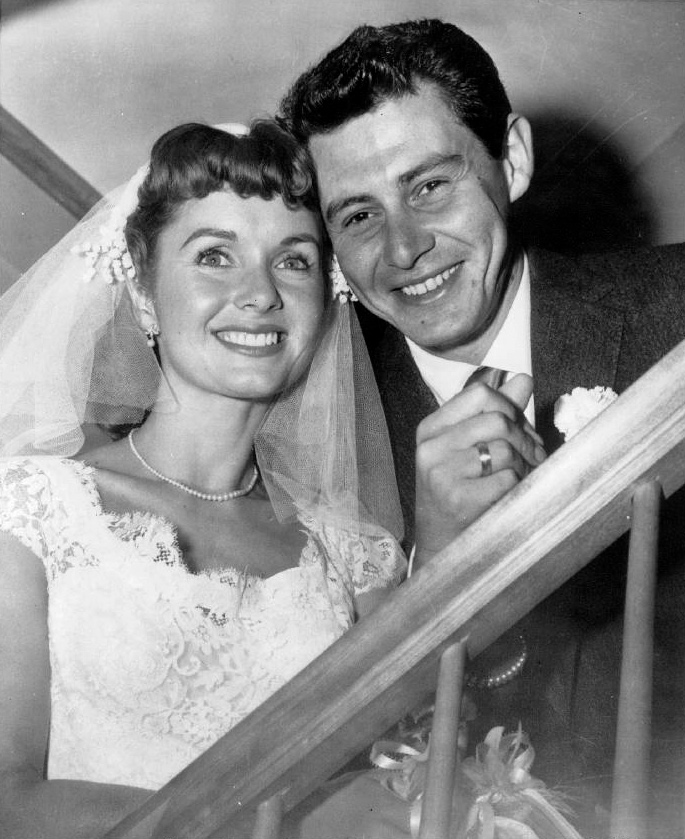
Debbie Reynolds and Fisher at their wedding, 1955

Fisher had five marriages and four children:

- Debbie Reynolds (September 26, 1955 – May 12, 1959; divorced)
  - Carrie Fisher
  - Todd Fisher
- Elizabeth Taylor (May 12, 1959 – March 5, 1964; divorced)
- Connie Stevens (February 9, 1967 – June 12, 1969; divorced)
  - Joely Fisher
  - Tricia Leigh Fisher
- Terry Richard (October 29, 1975 – April 1, 1976; divorced)
- Betty Lin (July 14, 1993 – April 15, 2001; her death)

In 1981, Fisher wrote an autobiography, Eddie: My Life, My Loves. He wrote another autobiography in 1999 titled Been There, Done That. The latter book devotes little space to Fisher's singing career, but recycled the material of his first book and added many new sexual details that were too strong to publish before. Upon the book's publication, his daughter Carrie declared: "I'm thinking of having my DNA fumigated."

While performing at The Tropicana Hotel in 1957, Fisher had numerous affairs with women, which contributed to his turbulent marriage to Debbie Reynolds. One of his notable affairs was with model Pat Sheehan. They eventually parted ways after Fisher refused to divorce Reynolds. He would divorce Reynolds two years later in a brief proceeding reportedly lasting ten minutes and costing ten dollars, before marrying actress Elizabeth Taylor. Fisher did not have the money at hand, so he borrowed it from his TV show producer Bernie Rich, saying that it was "worth every penny of his money".

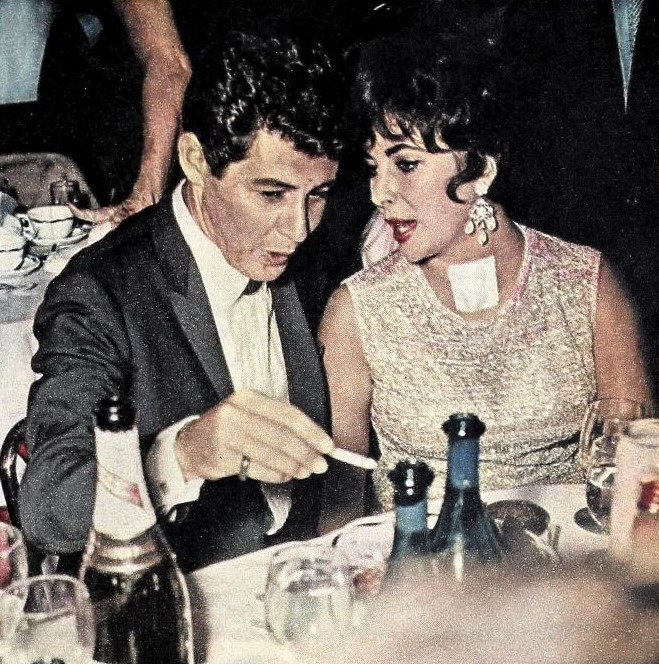
Eddie Fisher and Elizabeth Taylor in November 1961

When she was interviewed, Debbie Reynolds said that she could understand being dumped "for the world's most beautiful woman", referring to Taylor, who was previously a close friend. Taylor and Reynolds later resumed their friendship and mocked Fisher in a TV movie written by Carrie Fisher, These Old Broads, in which their characters ridiculed the ex-husband they shared, named "Freddie Hunter".

In his memoirs, Fisher admitted to addictions to drugs and gambling, which aggravated his career problems. He wrote that his addiction to drugs began in 1953 with the so-called "vitamin" shots administered by the notorious "Dr. Feelgood", Max Jacobson, shots that contained methamphetamine. Fisher said he eventually kicked his drug addiction in 1990 after undergoing rehabilitation at the Betty Ford Clinic. In his autobiography, Been There, Done That, Fisher also claimed that following his separation from Taylor, he had numerous affairs with such women as Ann-Margret, Juliet Prowse, Stefanie Powers, Sue Lyon, Edie Adams, Judith Campbell, Mia Farrow, and Michelle Phillips. Phillips categorically denied Fisher's claim that they had an affair.

Beginning in fall 1959, Fisher established two scholarships at Brandeis University, one for classical and one for popular music, in the name of Eddie Cantor.

Fisher supported Lyndon B. Johnson in the 1964 United States presidential election.

== Death ==
Fisher fell and broke his hip on September 9, 2010, and died 13 days later on September 22, 2010, at his home in Berkeley, California, from complications from hip surgery, at the age of 82. His ashes were interred at Cypress Lawn Memorial Park next to his wife Betty Lin, who died in 2001.

== Discography ==
The lists below show the singer's studio albums, compilation albums, and hit songs only. His full discography, singles, and other releases are described in a separate article.

=== Studio albums ===
- Eddie Fisher Sings (10-inch album) (RCA Victor 1952)
- I'm in the Mood for Love (RCA Victor 1952/55)
- Christmas with Eddie Fisher (10-inch album) (RCA Victor 1952)
- Eddie Fisher Sings Irving Berlin Favorites (10-inch album) (RCA Victor 1954)
- May I Sing to You? (RCA Victor 1954/55)
- I Love You (RCA Victor 1955)
- Eddie Fisher Sings Academy Award Winning Songs (RCA Victor 1955)
- Bundle of Joy (film soundtrack) (RCA Victor 1956)
- As Long as There's Music (RCA Victor 1958)
- Scent of Mystery (film soundtrack) (Ramrod 1960)
- Eddie Fisher at the Winter Garden (Ramrod 1963)
- Eddie Fisher Today! (Dot 1965)
- When I Was Young (Dot 1965) (re-recordings of his RCA Victor hits)
- Mary Christmas (Dot 1965)
- Young and Foolish (Dot 1965)
- Games That Lovers Play (RCA Victor 1966)
- People Like You (RCA Victor 1967)
- You Ain't Heard Nothin' Yet (RCA Victor 1968)
- After All (Bainbridge Records 1984)

=== Compilations ===
- Thinking of You (RCA Victor 1957)
- Heart! (RCA Camden 1958)
- Eddie Fisher's Greatest Hits (RCA Victor 1962)
- Bring Back the Thrill (RCA Camden 1963)
- The Best of Eddie Fisher (RCA Victor 1965, reissue of 1962 "Greatest Hits" LP)
- This is Eddie Fisher (RCA Victor 1972)
- Eddie Fisher's Greatest Hits (RCA 1975, reissue of 1962 LP)
- The Very Best of Eddie Fisher (MCA 1988)
- All Time Greatest Hits Vol.1 (RCA 1989)
- Eddie Fisher – Greatest Hits (RCA 2001)

=== Hit songs ===
Single	Year	Chart positions			
Single	Year	US	CB	AC	UK
"You Can't Be True, Dear" (with Marlin Sisters)	1948	19	—	—	—
"Thinking of You"	1950	5	3	—	—
"Bring Back the Thrill"	1951	14	—	—	—
"Unless"	1951	17	—	—	—
"I'll Hold You in My Heart"	1951	18	—	—	—
"Turn Back the Hands of Time"	1951	8	8	—	—
"Any Time"	1951	2	3	—	—
"Tell Me Why"	1952	4	—	—	—
"Trust in Me"	1952	25	—	—	—
"Forgive Me"	1952	7	7	—	—
"That's the Chance You Take"	1952	10	—	—	—
"I'm Yours"	1952	3	2	—	—
"Just a Little Lovin'"	1952	20	—	—	—
"Maybe" (with Perry Como)	1952	3	—	—	—
"Watermelon Weather" (with Perry Como)	1952	19	—	—	—
"I Remember When"	1952	29	—	—	—
"Wish You Were Here"	1952	1	2	—	8
"The Hand of Fate"	1952	24	—	—	—
"Lady of Spain"	1952	6	6	—	—
"Outside of Heaven"	1952	8	13	—	1
"Everything I Have Is Yours"	1952	23	38	—	8
"Christmas Day"	1952	22	—	—	—
"You're All I Want for Christmas"	1953	22	—	—	—
"Even Now"	1953	7	9	—	—
"Downhearted"	1953	5	16	—	3
"How Do You Speak to an Angel?"	1953	14	25	—	—
"I'm Walking Behind You"	1953	1	1	—	1
"Just Another Polka"	1953	24	18	—	—
"With These Hands"	1953	7	8	—	—
"Many Times"	1953	4	8	—	—
"Just to Be with You"	1953	18	—	—	—
"Oh! My Pa-Pa"	1953	1	1	—	9
"A Girl, a Girl"	1954	6	6	—	—
"Anema E Core"	1954	14	12	—	—
"Green Years"	1954	8	13	—	—
"My Friend"	1954	15	12	—	—
"The Little Shoemaker" (with Hugo Winterhalter)	1954	9	2	—	—
"The Magic Tango" (with Hugo Winterhalter)	1954	22	27	—	—
"Heaven Was Never Like This"	1954	21	27	—	—
"I Need You Now"	1954	1	1	—	13
"Count Your Blessings (Instead of Sheep)"	1954	5	7	—	—
"Fanny"	1954	29	18	—	—
"A Man Chases a Girl"	1955	16	16	—	—
"Just One More Time"	1955	—	27	—	—
"Take My Love"	1955	—	36	—	—
"(I'm Always Hearing) Wedding Bells"	1955	20	13	—	5
"Heart"	1955	6	12	—	—
"Song of the Dreamer"	1955	11	10	—	—
"Don't Stay Away Too Long"	1955	—	41	—	—
"Magic Fingers"	1955	52	33	—	—
"I Wanna Go Where You Go"	1955	75	26	—	—
"Dungaree Doll"	1955	7	7	—	—
"Everybody's Got a Home but Me"	1955	20	34	—	—
"Without You"	1956	41	28	—	—
"No Other One"	1956	65	29	—	—
"On the Street Where You Live"	1956	18	—	—	—
"Sweet Heartaches"	1956	42	35	—	—
"O My Maria"	1956	80	—	—	—
"Cindy, Oh Cindy"	1956	10	9	—	5
"Some Day Soon"	1957	94	—	—	—
"Tonight My Heart Will Be Crying"	1957	96	—	—	—
"Sunshine Girl"	1957	94	—	—	—
"That's the Way It Goes"	1957	—	55	—	—
"Sayonara"	1957	—	56	—	—
"What's the Use of Cryin'"	1958	—	43	—	—
"Tonight"	1961	44	109	12	—
"Milk and Honey"	1961	—	104	—	—
"Shalom"	1961	—	105	—	—
"Arrivederci Roma"	1962	112	142	—	—
"Sunrise, Sunset"	1965	119	119	22	—
"Young and Foolish"	1965	—	—	25	—
"Games That Lovers Play"	1966	45	41	2	—
"People Like You"	1967	97	74	4	—
"Now I Know"	1967	131	135	23	—

== Bibliography ==
- Downey, Pat (1994). Cash box pop singles charts, 1950-1993. Englewood, Colo.: Libraries Unlimited. pp. 120–121. ISBN 1-56308-316-7.
- Fisher, Eddie; Fisher, David (July 15, 2000). Been There, Done That. Macmillan. ISBN 978-0-312-97558-6.
- Fisher, Eddie (1982). Eddie : My life, my loves. Penguin Group (USA) Incorporated. ISBN 978-0-425-05656-1.
- Kanfer, Stefan (1989). A summer world: the attempt to build a Jewish Eden in the Catskills from the days of the ghetto to the rise and decline of the Borscht Belt (1st ed.). New York: Farrar, Straus & Giroux. pp. 205–209. ISBN 978-0-3742-7180-0.
- Larkin, Colin (2007). The Encyclopedia of Popular Music. Omnibus Press. ISBN 978-1-84609-856-7.
- Roberts, David (2006). British Hit Singles & Albums (19th ed.). London: Guinness World Records Limited. p. 201. ISBN 978-1-9049-9410-7.
- TV Guide. Triangle Publications. 2004. "Eddie Fisher's performance of "Sunrise, Sunset" on *The Ed Sullivan Show* is featured in this issue."
- Whitburn, Joel (1973). "Joel Whitburn's Top LP's, 1945-1972". Record Research.

Whitburn, Joel (1982). Joel Whitburn's Bubbling under the hot 100, 1959-1981. Menomonee Falls, Wis: Record Research. p. 58. ISBN 978-0-8982-0047-8.

- Whitburn, Joel (2002). Joel Whitburn's top pop singles 1955-2002. Menomonee Falls, Wisc.: Record Research. p. 244. ISBN 0898201551.
- Whitburn, Joel (2007). Joel Whitburn presents Billboard top adult songs, 1961-2006: chart data compiled from Billboard's adult contemporary charts, 1961-2006, and adult top 40 charts, 1996-2006. Menomonee Falls, Wis: Record Research Inc. ISBN 978-0-89820-169-7.
- Whitburn, Joel (2009). Joel Whitburn's top pop singles. Menomonee Falls, Wis: Record Research. ISBN 978-0-89820-180-2.
