= Eddie Fisher Sings =

Studio album by Eddie Fisher
- Released: 1952
- Genre: Traditional pop; vocal pop
- Length: 22:46
- Label: RCA Victor

Eddie Fisher chronology
| Eddie Fisher Sings (1952) | I'm in the Mood for Love (1952) |

Professional ratings
Review scores
| Source | Rating |
|---|---|
| The Encyclopedia of Popular Music | 3/5 stars |

Eddie Fisher Sings is Eddie Fisher's first album, released in 1952. It was issued as a 10-inch long-playing record by RCA Victor Records.

== Charts ==
The album debuted on the Billboard Best Selling Pouplar Record Albums chart in the issue dated May 2, 1952, and remained on the chart for 22 weeks, peaking at number five.

== Other releases ==
In 2002, the album, with I'm in the Mood for Love and Christmas With Eddie Fisher, was issued on a compact disc.

== Track listing ==
| Track | Song Title | Originally By |
|---|---|---|
| 1. | Just Say I Love Her | Rodolfo Falvo, Jack Val, Jimmy Dale, Enzo Fusco, Martin Kalmanoff and Sam Ward |
| 2. | Sorry | Buddy Pepper, Anna Sosenko, Richard A. Whiting |
| 3. | A Little Bit Independent | Joe Burke, Edgar Leslie |
| 4. | If You Should Leave Me | Sam H. Stept |
| 5. | I Remember When | Percy Haid, Ed Sarche |
| 6. | Am I Wasting My Time on You? | Howard Johnson, Irving Bibo |
| 7. | I Love You Because | Leon Payne |
| 8. | Thinking of You | Harry Ruby and Bert Kalmar |
