= People Like You =

Studio album by Eddie Fisher
- Released: April 1967
- Studios: Webster Hall, New York City; RCA Victor's Music Center of the World, Hollywood, California
- Genre: Vocal pop
- Length: 31 minutes 32 seconds
- Language: English
- Labels: RCA Victor; LMP-3820; LSP-3820
- Producer: Al Schmitt

Eddie Fisher chronology
Games That Lovers Play (1966)	People Like You (1967)	You Ain't Heard Nothin' Yet (1968)

People Like You is Eddie Fisher's 15th album, released and recorded in 1967. Much like Games That Lovers Play, it was recorded right after the successful single it shares a name with. The album had reached the bottom half of the US album charts and received a positive contemporary reception, while getting more mixed retrospectives.

== Background and content ==
In 1966, Eddie Fisher was signed back onto his label RCA Victor, recording a hit single "Games That Lovers Play" and his best-selling album that year. People Like You was also recorded right after his successful single "People Like You", with many of the songs coming from the musical Mame, like "My Best Girl", "Mame" (the B-side of "Games That Lovers Play"), and "If She Walked Into My Life". "I Haven't Got Anything Better to Do" was the B-side of his last charting single "Now I Know". The album was produced by Al Schmitt. It was released in Apirl 1967.

== Chart performance and singles ==
The album debuted on the Billboard Top LPs chart in the issue dated July 1, 1967, and remained on the chart for three weeks, peaking at number 193. In Record World the album broke into the 100 Top LP's chart, peaking at number 87 in July. It was his last charting album.

The single, "People Like You", debuted on the Billboard Hot 100 chart on February 11, 1967, and peaked at number 97 during a three-week stay on the chart. The song spent a week at number four on the magazine's Easy Listening chart, during its 14-week stay. It reached number 74 on the Cashbox Top 100 Singles chart and stayed on it for four weeks.

== Critical reception ==
=== Contemporary ===
Ren Reed of Stereo Review stated that "Listening to Eddie Fisher has never been my idea of an inspiring musical experience, but in all fairness I must admit that his latest album is one of his best." Reed noted that "He sounds much more relaxed than usual, less neurotic, and consequently more controlled," but believed several songs had "dull" arrangements. Record World put the album in its "Albums of the Week" section, saying that the album has his "click single", and "of course a few tunes from Mame, plus other songs." The Anaheim Bulletin described Fisher's delivery of the tunes as "exciting". The Honolulu Advertiser stated that the album included a "flawless" rendition of "Born Free" and said that all the tracks were "big favorites".

=== Retrospectives ===
Professional ratings
Review scores
Source	Rating
AllMusic	3/5 stars
The Encyclopedia of Popular Music	2/5 stars

William Ruhlmann of AllMusic believed "People Like You" sounded like something Dean Martin should be doing, and that Fisher "indulged his affection" for Al Jolson in the Mame cuts. He added, "...there were some enjoyable performances, but the album as a whole was a disappointment after the standard set by Games That Lovers Play and its commercial failure slowed the momentum of Fisher's comeback." The Encyclopedia of Popular Music awarded the album a two-star rating, which meant they thought the album had "flaws".

== Track listing ==
All tracks arranged by Marty Manning, except where noted.

=== Side One ===
No.	Title	Writer(s)	Arranger	Length
1.	"Maybe Today"	Eddy Marnay, André Popp		2:49
2.	"You Don't Have to Say You Love Me"	Vicki Wickham, Simon Napier-Bell		2:52
3.	"People Like You"	Larry Kusik, Eddie Snyder	Nelson Riddle	2:13
4.	"My Best Girl"	Jerry Herman		2:33
5.	"Watch What Happens"	Norman Gimbel		2:49
6.	"Come Love!"	Alan and Marilyn Bergman	Sid Feller	2:21

=== Side Two ===
No.	Title	Writer(s)	Arranger	Length
7.	"I Haven't Got Anything Better To Do"	Paul Vance		2:39
8.	"I Will Wait For You"	Norman Gimbel		2:52
9.	"Born Free"	Don Black		3:13
10.	"If She Walked Into My Life"	Jerry Herman		4:02
11.	"Mame"	Jerry Herman	Richard Wess	3:06
Total length:				31:32

== Charts ==
Chart peaks for People Like You
Chart (1967)	Peak position
US Billboard Top LP's	193
US Record World 100 Top LP's	87

== Production ==
Recorded in Webster Hall, New York City and RCA Victor's Music Center of the World, Hollywood, California.

== Personnel ==
All credits are adapted from the liner notes of People Like You .

- Al Schmitt – producer
- Mickey Crofford – recording engineer
- Frank Laico – recording engineer
- Dick Bogert – recording engineer
- Marty Manning – arranger, conductor
- Richard Wess – arranger, conductor
- Sid Feller – arranger, conductor
- Nelson Riddle – arranger, conductor (appears through the courtesy of Liberty Records)
