= Spanish Nights and You =

Single by Connie Francis

from the album Gold
- B-side: "Games That Lovers Play"
- Released: October 1966
- Recorded: September 26, 1966, New York City
- Genre: Vocal pop
- Length: 2:20
- Label: MGM; 13610
- Songwriters: Wandra Merrell Brown, Ray Allen
- Producers: Alan Lorber, Pete Spargo

Connie Francis singles chronology
"So Nice (Summer Samba)" (1966)	"Spanish Nights and You" (1966)	"Another Page" (1967)

Professional ratings
Review scores
Source	Rating
Record World	4/5 stars

"Spanish Nights and You" is a song written by Wandra Merrell Brown and Ray Allen and most notably performed by Connie Francis in late 1966.

== Connie Franics version ==
=== Release and reception ===
"Spanish Nights and You" was released as a seven-inch single in October 1966 by MGM Records. It was backed by a James Last composed song (which was often cut in the fall of 1966), "Games That Lovers Play" on the B-side, which didn't see notable album inclusions. Both tracks were arranged by Alan Lorber and produced by him and Pete Spargo.

The single received a positive critical reception upon its release. Billboard magazine predicted that the single would reach the top 60 in the Hot 100 and described the song as an "Intriguing rhythmic ballad", also calling it a "Top Francis performance" and said that it "has the ingredients of the Martino winner, 'Spanish Eyes'". Record World gave the single four stars and said that it is a "Pretty and romantic Latin flavored tune Connie duets with herself", and also stated that "Action [is] due". Cashbox reviewed the single in late October and stated that "Those lovely tones and that crying voice that could only belong to Connie Francis should get the lark loads of action with this wonderful tune titled 'Spanish Nights And You.'" Continuing that "The sweeping, Latinized ork backing Connie’s multilingual reading gives the side a vast and varied appeal." The magazine also noted that the flip, "Games That Lovers Play" is a "nice reading of the oft cut ditty."

=== Chart performance ===
In November 1966, the track reached No. 15 on the Billboard Easy Listening chart and marked her return to the Billboard Hot 100 chart, where it reached No. 99. In Cashbox the single was ranked higher, peaking at No. 81 on the magazine's Top 100 Singles chart. The single wouldn't break into Record World's Top 100 Pops chart, instead reaching No. 2 on their Up-Coming Singles chart, which acted as a fifty song extension of the main chart.

=== Foreign release ===
The song was released in South Africa with the A and B-side being switched. The single reached No. 17 on the nation's charts.

=== Track listing ===
7" vinyl single

- "Spanish Nights and You" - 2:20
- "Games That Lovers Play" – 2:33
