= Albert Hague =

American songwriter (1920–2001)

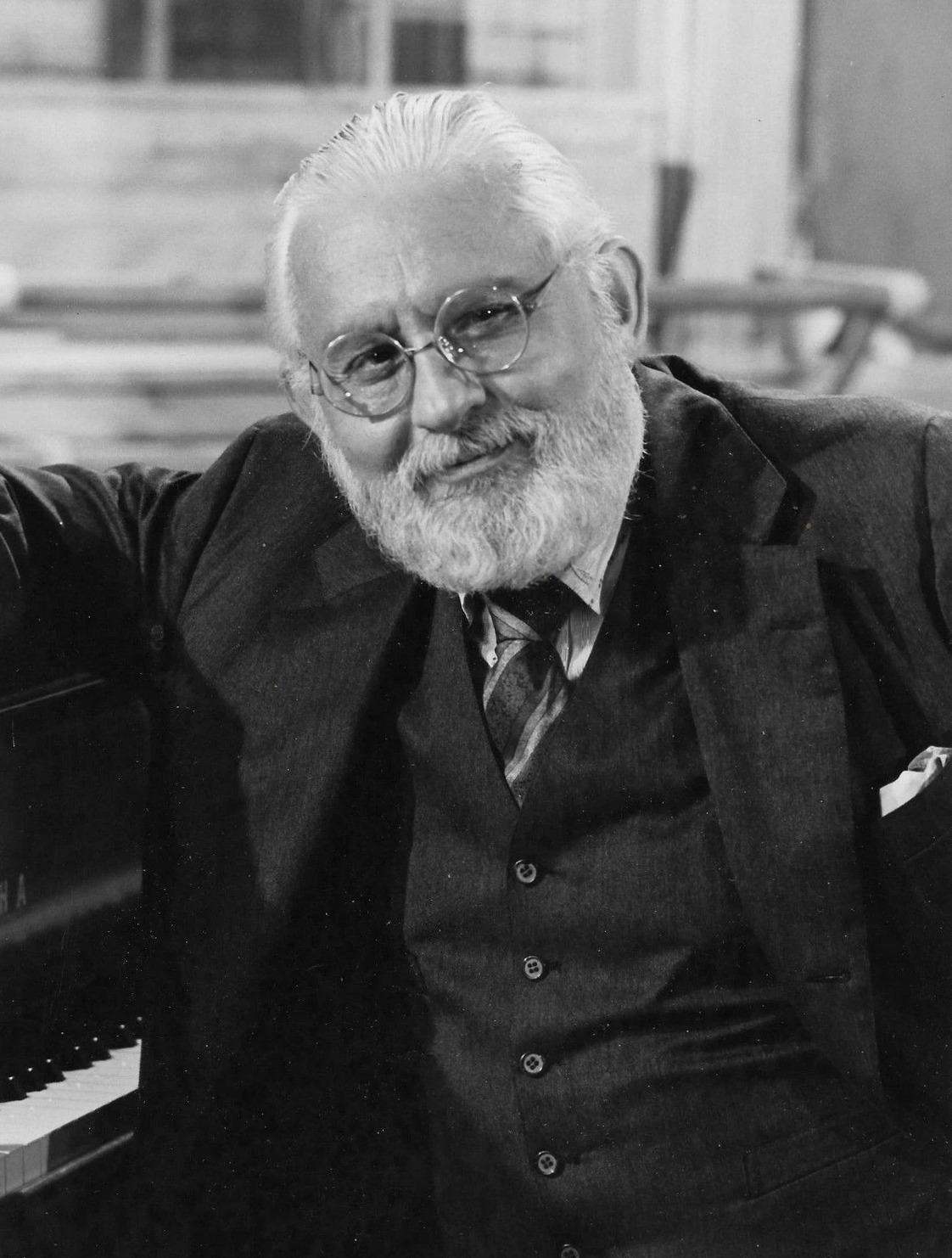
- Hague, c. 1982
- Born: Albert Marcuse; October 13, 1920; Berlin, Germany
- Died: November 12, 2001 (aged 81); Marina del Rey, California, U.S.
- Education: University of Cincinnati – College-Conservatory of Music
- Occupations: Songwriter; actor
- Spouse: Renee Orin (m. 1951; died 2000)
- Children: 2

Albert Hague (born Albert Marcuse, October 13, 1920 – November 12, 2001) was a German–born American songwriter and actor.

== Early life ==
Hague was born to a Jewish family in Berlin, Germany. His father, Harry Marcuse, was a psychiatrist and a musical prodigy, and his mother, Mimi (née Heller), a chess champion. His family considered their Jewish heritage a liability and raised him as a Lutheran (although he would later embrace his Jewish heritage after coming to the United States). Shortly before he was to be inducted into the Hitler Youth, he and his mother fled to Rome. Hague came to America in 1939 after his sister, who lived in Ohio, got him a musical scholarship at the University of Cincinnati. However, as he did not have a legal immigration status to be in the country, he was adopted by an eye surgeon associated with the university. After graduating in 1942, he served in the United States Army's special service band during World War II.

== Career ==
Hague's Broadway musicals include Plain and Fancy (1955), Redhead (1959), Cafe Crown (1964), and The Fig Leaves Are Falling (1969, with lyrics by Allan Sherman).

Famous songs he wrote include "Young and Foolish", "Look Who's in Love" and "Did I Ever Really Live?" He was the composer for the TV musical cartoon How the Grinch Stole Christmas and some songs in the 2000 musical version. He also was an actor, most notably on the TV series Fame, where he played Benjamin Shorofsky, the music teacher. It was a part he originated in the film of the same name. Hague also played a small role in the movie Space Jam (1996), as the psychiatrist that the professional basketball players go to when they lose their "skill".

Hague and his wife Renee occasionally presented a cabaret act, first as "Hague and Hague: His Hits and His Mrs." and later, in 1998, under the title "Still Young and Foolish". They played at Carnegie Hall, the Cinegrill in Los Angeles, and Eighty Eight's in Manhattan.

Hague was a member of The Lambs where he often taught musical theatre to members.

== Personal life and death ==
His wife, Renee Orin, an actress and singer, with whom he often collaborated, died, aged 73, in August 2000 from lymphoma. They had been married since 1951, and had two children. Albert Hague died at age 81 from cancer at a hospital in Marina del Rey, California in November 2001.

== Filmography ==
Film
Year	Title	Role	Notes
1980	Fame	Shorofsky	
1983	Nightmares	Mel Keefer	(segment "Night of the Rat")
1996	Space Jam	Psychiatrist	
1996	Playing Dangerous 2	Professor Agranoff	
1999	The Story of Us	Dr. Siegler	(final film role)
