= Back in Your Own Backyard =

1928 song

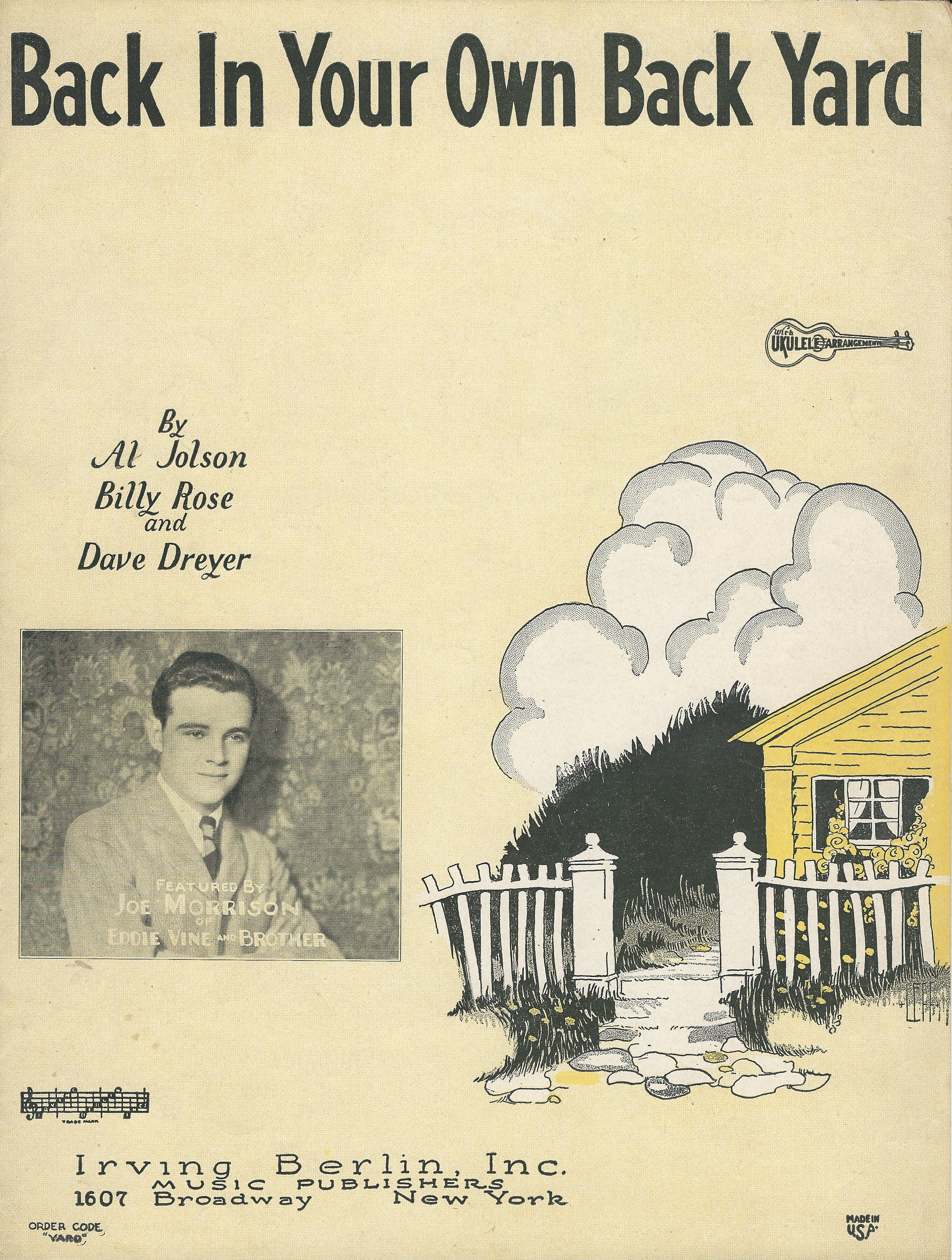
Sheet music cover

"Back in Your Own Back Yard" is a popular song with lyrics written by Al Jolson and Billy Rose with music by Dave Dreyer. A popular recording by Ruth Etting, made on January 3, 1928, was issued by Columbia Records as catalog number 1288-D, with the flip side "When You're with Somebody Else". Jolson also recorded the song in 1928, on March 8, with Bill Wirges' Orchestra for Brunswick Records (catalog number 3867) with the flip side "Ol' Man River".

== Other recordings ==
- 1928: Eva Taylor - recorded on June 2, 1928, for Okeh Records (catalog No. 8585).
- 1937: Fletcher Henderson - recorded on March 22, 1937 for Vocalion (catalog No. 3511).
- 1938: Billie Holiday - recorded January 12, 1938, for Vocalion Records (catalog No. 4029).
- 1959: Sun Ra - released on January 1, 1959 on the album Sound Sun Pleasure. This recording had Hattye Randolph on vocals.
- 1947: Al Jolson - re-recorded on June 9, 1947, for Decca Records (catalog No. 24108).
- 1950: It was subsequently revived by Patti Page in a recording made on June 16, 1950. The Page recording was issued by Mercury Records as catalog number 5463. It entered the Billboard chart on October 7, 1950, at No. 23, lasting only that one week.
- 1954: Bing Crosby recorded the song for use on his radio show and it was subsequently included in the box set The Bing Crosby CBS Radio Recordings (1954–56) issued by Mosaic Records (catalog MD7-245) in 2009.
- 1955: Margaret Whiting
- 1958: The Andrews Sisters - for their album The Andrews Sisters Sing the Dancing '20s.
- 1958: Eydie Gormé - for her album Eydie Gormé – Vamps The Roaring 20's<
- 1958: Peggy Lee - in her album Jump for Joy
- 1959: Brenda Lee - for her album Grandma, What Great Songs You Sang!
- 1959: Vera Lynn - included the album Vera Lynn Sings Songs of the Twenties
- 1962: Nancy Wilson - for her album Hello Young Lovers
- 1963: Sammy Davis Jr. - for his album As Long as She Needs Me
- 1968: Eddie Fisher - for his album You Ain't Heard Nothin' Yet
- 2004: Madeleine Peyroux - for the album Got You on My Mind

== Film appearances ==
- 1929: Say It with Songs - sung by Al Jolson
- 1939: That's Right—You're Wrong - played by the Kay Kyser Band at the radio program
- 1943: Silver Spurs - sung by Roy Rogers
- 1949: Jolson Sings Again - performed by Larry Parks (dubbed by Al Jolson)
