= Christmas with Eddie Fisher =

Studio album by Eddie Fisher
- Released: 1952
- Genre: Traditional pop, vocal
- Length: 21 minutes 53 seconds
- Label: RCA Victor; LPM 3065

Eddie Fisher chronology
I'm in the Mood for Love (1952)	Christmas with Eddie Fisher (1952)	Eddie Fisher Sings Irving Berlin Favorites (1954)

Professional ratings
Review scores
Source	Rating
AllMusic	2/5 stars
The Encyclopedia of Popular Music	2/5 stars

Christmas with Eddie Fisher is a 1952 album by Eddie Fisher. It was issued as a ten-inch long-playing record by RCA Victor Records. It was the first of two Christmas albums that he would record in his lifetime.

== Overview ==
The album was released with the success of his hit single, "Christmas Day", which would go on to reach No. 22 in the US on December 27, 1952. It featured five standards and three brand-new songs, having eight songs in total. The album debuted on the Billboard albums chart on December 6, 1952, peaking at number two and remaining on the chart for four weeks. It was his highest-charting album on the chart. "You're All I Want for Christmas" was also released as a single and would go on to also peak at No. 22 on the Billboard singles chart the next year.

== Critical reception ==
William Ruhlman of AllMusic commented on the album, "There wasn't anything special about it, unless you were a Fisher fan, which there were many of in that time". He noted that Fisher used his "resonant tenor to express the holiday sentiments." The album was given a two-star rating by The Encyclopedia of Popular Music as well.

== Track listing ==
Side one
No.	Title	Writer(s)	Length
1.	"Silent Night"	Franz Xaver Gruber, Joseph Mohr	2:33
2.	"White Christmas"	Irving Berlin	2:59
3.	"You're All I Want for Christmas"	Seger Ellis	2:43
4.	"Christmas Day"	Benny Davis, Ted Murray	3:01

Side two
No.	Title	Writer(s)	Length
5.	"That's What Christmas Means to Me"	Anna Gordy Gaye, George Gordy, Allen Story	3:31
6.	"Here Comes Santa Claus"	Gene Autry, Harriet Melka, and Oakley Haldeman	2:16
7.	"Jingle Bells"	James Lord Pierpont	1:57
8.	"O Come All Ye Faithful"	Unknown authorship	2:53
Total length:			21:53

== Chart performance ==
Chart (1952)	Peak position
US Billboard Best-Selling Popular Albums (45 R.P.M.)	2

== Personnel ==
- Vocals – Eddie Fisher
- Backing – Hugo Winterhalter's Orchestra and Chorus
- Design – Clare Romano Ross
