= Marv Johnson =

American singer and songwriter (1938–1993)

Background information
- Born: Marvin Earl Johnson; October 15, 1938; Detroit, Michigan, U.S.
- Died: May 16, 1993 (aged 54) Columbia, South Carolina, U.S.
- Occupations: Singer; songwriter; pianist
- Instruments: Vocals; piano
- Years active: 1956–1993
- Labels: United Artists; Motown Records; Motorcity Records

Marvin Earl Johnson (October 15, 1938 – May 16, 1993) was an American R&B singer, songwriter and pianist. He was influential in the development of the Motown style of music, primarily for the song "Come to Me," which was the first record issued by Tamla Records, the precursor to the famous label.

Despite his early success in the United States, Johnson ultimately enjoyed more popularity overseas than in his native country. His music was especially popular in the United Kingdom and Australia.

== Biography ==
Johnson was born in Detroit. His early musical influences included gospel and blues, but he began his singing career with a doo-wop group, the Junior Serenaders, in the mid-1950s. He was discovered by Berry Gordy while performing at a carnival; Gordy had already decided to form his first record label, Tamla, and Johnson's recording of the song "Come to Me" became the label's first single, released in May 1959. The fledgling label did not have national distribution, so the song was released by United Artists Records. It reached number 30 on Billboard magazine's all-genre Hot 100 chart and number 6 on the national R&B chart. Johnson went on to co-write another four songs with Gordy. After he issued the first release for the Tamla (Motown) label, Johnson was signed by United Artists. He released three albums and several singles for United Artists, but continued to record in Motown's homegrown studios at Hitsville USA in Detroit.

Between 1959 and 1961, Johnson issued nine Billboard Hot 100 singles, including two Top 10s. All were written (or co-written) and produced by Gordy. The first of them was "You Got What It Takes", which reached number 10 in the US and number 7 in the UK Singles Chart. It sold over one million copies and was awarded a gold disc. In the United Kingdom, both "I Love the Way You Love" and "Ain't Gonna Be That Way" made the UK chart. "I Love the Way You Love" reached number 9 in the US. Johnson had his final US Top 40 single in 1960 with "(You've Got To) Move Two Mountains". It also sold a million copies, giving him his second gold disc.

Johnson had many hits in Australia, with a total of eight top 40 hits, including three chart-toppers. "Come to Me" was released in Australia on EMI's London Records (as were most of his Australian releases) and reached number 16 on the 2UE Top 40 in Sydney. "You Got What It Takes" was his biggest Australian hit, topping the national charts for over 16 weeks in 1960. After "I Love the Way You Love" became a national Top 10 hit in mid-1960, Johnson flew to Australia to meet the entrepreneur Lee Gordon, the creator of the radio program Big Show, and performed "Twist It Up" on the September Big Show. At the top of the bill were Bobby Rydell, Chubby Checker, and James Darren with Jackie Wilson, Johnson, and Barry Mann. They were supported by Johnny O'Keefe, the Delltones and Col Joye. Lonnie Lee also appeared on a Lee Gordon Australian tour in 1960 with Marv, Bobby Tyrell, and The Everly Brothers.

Johnson's songs "Happy Days" and "Merry-Go-Round" (both written by Berry Gordy) were his last chart successes for the United Artists label. Although they did not reach the US Top 40, they performed well on the R&B charts, peaking at number 7 and number 26, respectively, in 1961.

However, after early 1961 (and after nine consecutive chart hits) Johnson's records stopped making the charts altogether. United Artists kept him on through a string of 10 consecutive non-charting singles from mid-1961 through early 1964; Gordy was at the production helm for the first three, and for the next three other Motown producers (including William "Mickey" Stevenson) were called in to produce. United Artists then took Johnson out of the Motown orbit, and for the next four singles, they paired Johnson with a series of Brill Building writers, producers and arrangers, including Jerry Leiber and Mike Stoller, Burt Bacharach and Hal David, and Bert Berns. But further significant chart action proved elusive, and Johnson was eventually released from his contract with United Artists.

Johnson then re-signed with Motown in 1964, writing and producing as well as recording. "Why Do You Want to Let Me Go" was his first Motown single after he rejoined the company, released by Motown's Gordy subsidiary in May 1965. Johnson's final US chart appearance was "I Miss You Baby (How I Miss You)", which was a minor hit, reaching number 39 on the R&B chart in April 1966. His next release, "I'll Pick a Rose for My Rose", issued in 1968, failed to chart; it was his last American single.

In the United Kingdom, however, "I'll Pick a Rose" became a hit after it reached number 10 in early 1969, thanks to its popularity from the Northern soul scene. Motown dug into its vaults for tracks to create an album for the British market, I'll Pick a Rose for My Rose, released by Tamla Motown in 1969, which contained many of Johnson's songs recorded since he had signed there in the mid-1960s, including "Why Do You Want to Let Me Go", "I'm Not a Plaything" and "I Miss You Baby (How I Miss You)". The latter was also reissued as a single by Tamla Motown and was a hit in Britain, reaching number 25 on the UK chart in November 1969. He also toured the UK with Martha Reeves & the Vandellas.

Johnson remained with Motown, working on sales and promotion, in the 1970s. He also wrote songs for Tyrone Davis and Johnnie Taylor. He co-wrote the Dells’ R&B hit "Give Your Baby a Standing Ovation", which peaked at number 3 on the R&B chart and number 34 on the Hot 100 in 1973. Johnson continued to write songs at Motown way into the 1970s. He eventually separated from the label.

Johnson continued singing into the 1990s, releasing a solo album on the London-based Motorcity Records label, owned by Northern soul DJ and Motown lover Ian Levine. Johnson was one of the first and, according to Levine, one of "the most loyal and the most grateful" of all the former Motown artists he recorded. Two singles were released, "By Hook or by Crook" in 1988 and "Run Like a Rabbit" in 1989.

On May 14, 1993, Johnson was performing in Sumter, South Carolina for a tribute concert to Bill Pinkney of the Drifters and collapsed, and he was rushed to the hospital. Johnson died from complications of a stroke on May 16 that same year, in Columbia, South Carolina, at the age of 54. He was interred at Woodlawn Cemetery in Detroit. His headstone reads "Motown Pioneer".

In 2011, a compilation album featuring all songs recorded by Johnson during his second stay at Motown was released. I'll Pick a Rose for My Rose: The Complete Motown Recordings 1964–1971 was an authorised reissue of his Motown recordings, released under the Kent Soul label, an Ace Records subsidiary that releases Northern soul music. The first eleven tracks are from his 1969 album, I'll Pick a Rose for My Rose, which includes the title track, its original B-side ("You Got the Love I Love") and "I Miss You Baby (How I Miss You)". It also contains several previously unissued songs, such as "Farewell Is a Lonely Sound" (originally recorded by Jimmy Ruffin), and mono mixes of his three Gordy singles.

In 2015, Marv Johnson was inducted into the Michigan Rock and Roll Legends Hall of Fame.

== Discography ==
=== Albums ===
- Marvelous Marv Johnson (1960) – United Artists
- More Marv Johnson (1961) – United Artists
- I Believe (1966) – United Artists
- I'll Pick a Rose for My Rose (1969) UK TMG 680 (Re-issued TMG1052) – Motown
- The Very Best – Motor City Recordings (1995) – Carlton Home Entertainment
- I'll Pick a Rose for My Rose – The Complete Motown Recordings 1964–1971 (2011) – Kent Soul (Ace Records)

=== Singles ===
Year	Single (Songwriters)	Peak Chart Positions			Label
Year	Single (Songwriters)	US	US R&B	UK	Label
1959	"Come to Me" (Berry Gordy, Jr. / Marv Johnson)	30	6	—	Tamla (Motown)
1959	"Come to Me" (Berry Gordy, Jr. / Marv Johnson)	30	6	—	United Artists
1959	"I'm Coming Home" (Berry Gordy, Jr.)	82	23	—	United Artists
1960	"You Got What It Takes" (Berry Gordy, Jr. / Gwen Gordy / Tyran Carlo)	10	2	7	United Artists
1960	"I Love the Way You Love" (Berry Gordy, Jr. / Mike Ossman / Al Abrams / John O'Den)	9	2	35	United Artists
1960	"Ain't Gonna Be That Way" (A-Side) (Berry Gordy, Jr. / Marv Johnson)	74	—	50	United Artists
1960	"All the Love I've Got" (B-Side) (Janie Bradford / Berry Gordy, Jr. / Brian Holland)	63	—	—	United Artists
1960	"(You've Got To) Move Two Mountains" (Berry Gordy, Jr.)	20	12	—	United Artists
1961	"Happy Days" (Berry Gordy, Jr. / T. McKnight)	58	7	—	United Artists
1961	"Merry-Go-Round" (Berry Gordy, Jr.)	61	26	—	United Artists
1961	"How Can We Tell Him?"	—	—	—	United Artists
1961	"Oh, Mary"	—	—	—	United Artists
1961	"Johnny, One Stop"	—	—	—	United Artists
1962	"With All That's in Me"	—	—	—	United Artists
1962	"Let Yourself Go"	—	—	—	United Artists
1962	"Keep Tellin' Yourself"	—	—	—	United Artists
1963	"Another Tear Falls"	—	—	—	United Artists
1963	"Come On and Stop" (Bert Russell)	—	—	—	United Artists
1963	"Congratulations, You've Hurt Me Again"	—	—	—	United Artists
1963	"The Man Who Don't Believe in Love"	—	—	—	United Artists
1965	"Why Do You Want to Let Me Go?" (Berry Gordy, Jr.)	—	—	—	Gordy (Motown)
1966	"I Miss You Baby (How I Miss You)" (Clarence Paul / Morris Broadnax)	—	39	—	Gordy (Motown)
1969	"I'll Pick a Rose for My Rose" (James Dean / Marv Johnson / William Weatherspoon)	—	—	10	Gordy (Motown)
1969	"I Miss You Baby (How I Miss You)" (UK reissue)	—	—	25	Tamla Motown
1970	"So Glad You Chose Me" (UK only)	—	—	—	Tamla Motown
1988	"By Hook or by Crook" (UK only)	—	—	—	Motorcity
1989	"Run Like a Rabbit" (UK only)	—	—	—	Motorcity
"—" denotes releases that did not chart or were not released in that territory.
