= Count Your Blessings (Instead of Sheep) =

Song written by Irving Berlin

"Count Your Blessings (Instead of Sheep)" is a popular song written by Irving Berlin and used in the 1954 film White Christmas. It is commonly performed as a Christmas song, although the lyrics make no reference to the December holiday.

== History ==
The song arose from a personal experience of Berlin when his doctor suggested he try "counting his blessings" as a way to deal with insomnia brought on by stress. In a letter to 20th Century Fox executive Joseph Schenck, Berlin wrote:

"I’m enclosing a lyric of a song I finished here and which I am going to publish immediately…You have always said that I commercial my emotions and many times you were wrong, but this particular song is based on what really happened. ... The story is in its verse, which I don't think I'll publish. As I say in the lyrics, sometime ago, after the worst kind of a sleepless night, my doctor came to see me and after a lot of self-pity, belly-aching and complaining about my insomnia, he looked at me and said "speaking of doing something about your insomnia, did you ever try counting your blessings?"

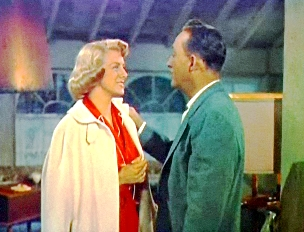
Rosemary Clooney and Bing Crosby in White Christmas

Berlin then incorporated the song to the film White Christmas to advance the relationship between the characters played by Bing Crosby and Rosemary Clooney. The sentimental theme reminds listeners to remember how much they are blessed instead of fretting about short-term problems.

=== Nomination ===
It was nominated for an Academy Award as "Best Song" but was defeated by "Three Coins in the Fountain" from the film of the same name written by Jule Styne and lyricist Sammy Cahn. It was performed on the 1955 Academy Awards telecast by vocalist Peggy King.

=== Recordings ===
The best-known recordings were made by Rosemary Clooney and Bing Crosby—who both appeared in the film—as well as some separate recordings by Eddie Fisher, Sonny Rollins, Andy Williams, Tammy Wynette, Jimmy Durante, and the Ray Conniff Singers. The versions which reached the top of the Billboard charts were by Eddie Fisher (peaked at No. 5), Bing Crosby (No. 27) and Rosemary Clooney (No. 27). In the UK, Crosby's version reached the No. 11 spot.
