= Dungaree Doll =

Single by Eddie Fisher
- B-side: "Everybody's Got a Home but Me"
- Released: November 1955
- Genre: Pop
- Length: 1:58
- Label: RCA
- Songwriters: Sherman Edwards, Ben Raleigh

Eddie Fisher singles chronology
"Magic Fingers" (1955)	"Dungaree Doll" (1955)	"Any Time" (1956)

"Dungaree Doll" is a song written by Sherman Edwards and Ben Raleigh and performed by Eddie Fisher featuring Hugo Winterhalter and His Orchestra and Chorus. It reached #7 in the U.S. in 1956.

The B-side to Fisher's version, "Everybody's Got a Home but Me", reached #20 in the U.S. in 1956.

== Other versions ==
- Mitch Miller and Orchestra released a version of the song as a single in 1955, but it did not chart.
- Fred Bertelmann released a version of the song as a single in 1956 in Germany entitled "Tanderadei", but it did not chart.
- Ray Ventura released a version of the song as a single in 1957 in France, but it did not chart.
- Crazy Otto released a version of the song on his 1958 EP Crazy Otto International, Vol. 2. as part of medley with the songs "Manhattan" and "I Wonder Who's Kissing Her Now".
- Jerry Lee Lewis released a version of the song on his 1999 album The Complete London Sessions, Vol. 1. This version was also featured in the 2006 remaster of The Session.
