= After All (Eddie Fisher album) =

Studio album by Eddie Fisher
- Released: 1984
- Genre: Vocal pop, easy listening
- Length: 28:45
- Label: Bainbridge Records; BT-6262

Eddie Fisher chronology
You Ain't Heard Nothin' Yet (1968)	After All (1984)

Professional ratings
Review scores
Source	Rating
AllMusic	3/5 stars

After All is the final studio album by American singer Eddie Fisher, recorded and released in 1984. It was his last recording session, with the exception of another one with the London Philharmonic Orchestra in 1995, but those songs were never released. After All was 16 years apart from his previous studio album, which was a tribute to Al Jolson, You Ain't Heard Nothin' Yet.

== Background ==
Eddie Fisher had retired from his recording career for almost 15 years by 1984, but that year he would record eight songs. The album would be produced by William J. O'Malley and arranged by Angelo DiPippo. Fisher tried to stop the album from being released, but it eventually showed up on the record stores shelves entitled After All, with the label distributing the album being Bainbridge Records.

Fisher, a singer last heard from on disc at about the age of 40 was in his mid-fifties, and like Frank Sinatra at a similar point in his career he sang singing songs that reflect back on the past with some regret and some stubborn pride, particularly on "If I Never Sing Another Song". "I Am What I Am", written by Jerry Herman whose songs Fisher had been recording since 1962, reflects on his previous drug use and bad career choices, but that he now overcame them.

== Reception ==
William Ruhlman of AllMusic retrospectively wrote that "The singer's voice is also somewhat reminiscent of the mature Sinatra, much deeper than in his teen idol days when he was a tenor-baritone. Now, he's more of a baritone-bass, and he isn't always in full control. Notably, 'Memory' from the musical Cats, although its themes of aging and self-pity fit in with the overall temper of the LP, probably wasn't the best choice for Fisher, given its lengthy melody line, which seems to tax his breathing. On the other hand, he manages the cry-in-your-beer country style of 'Love Lies' and the diluted disco of 'Desire' just fine."

== Track listing ==
No.	Title	Length
1.	"Better Than Ever"	3:03
2.	"Best of Times"	3:10
3.	"I Am What I Am"	3:04
4.	"Love Lies"	2:56
5.	"Memory"	5:17
6.	"After All"	4:04
7.	"If I Never Sing Another Song"	3:28
8.	"Desire"	3:32
Total length:		28:45
