= I'll Pick a Rose for My Rose =

1968 single by Marv Johnson

Single by Marv Johnson
- B-side: "You Got the Love I Love"
- Released: 1968 (UK), 1969 (US)
- Genre: Funk; Soul pop
- Label: Gordy (Motown); 7077

Marv Johnson singles chronology
"I Miss You Baby (How I Miss You)" (1966)	"I'll Pick a Rose for My Rose" (1969)	"So Glad You Chose Me" (1970)

"I'll Pick a Rose for My Rose"

Single by Eddie Fisher
- B-side: "Lady Mae"
- Released: March 1969
- Genre: Vocal pop
- Length: 2:35
- Label: Musicor Records
- Producers: Julie Rifkind, Roy Rifkind

Eddie Fisher singles chronology
"Now I Know" (1967)	"I'll Pick a Rose for My Rose" (1969)

"I'll Pick a Rose for My Rose" is a soul-pop ballad written by James Dean, William Weatherspoon, and Marv Johnson first recorded in 1968. Johnson's version hit the top-10 in the UK, while another version by Eddie Fisher in 1969 saw limited success in the US.

== Background and composition ==
The song tells the story of a man reflecting on lost love and the hope of rekindling it. The metaphor of picking a rose represents enduring affection and a symbolic return to a past relationship. Set against a smooth, orchestrated backdrop, the lyrics combine themes of regret, romance, and emotional maturity.

== Notable recordings ==
=== Marv Johnson version ===
- Marv Johnson, one of the original architects of the Motown sound and the song's co-writer, was the first to record the track in 1968. The session was produced by the other two co-writers. Although Johnson's popularity had waned by the mid-1960s, the song brought him renewed success overseas, reaching No. 10 in the UK (his best charting song in seven years). In the United States the song was released a year later and was predicted to reach the top 60 on the Billboard Hot 100 but it never appeared on the chart. Billboard magazine also stated that the song is a "smooth rocker" with an "infectious beat". The song's success prompted Johnson to do a three-week tour in the United Kingdom (March to April).

=== Eddie Fisher version ===
- Eddie Fisher recorded the song in 1969, and it was released as his final single paired with "Lady Mae" in March. The songs were produced by the Rifkinds of Guardian productions and arranged by Bernard Hoffer for Musicor Records. Fisher toured to promote the single and performed at Caesar's Palace in Vegas for two weeks beginning April 1969. Cashbox magazine's review of the single noted that "this song gives Eddie Fisher a younger pop sound than he has had in earlier outings. Could see a solid MOR response." The single had barely scrapped the charts, only peaking at No. 140 on the Record World charts during a three-week run on them.

== Charts ==
Weekly chart performance for Marv Johson's "I'll Pick a Rose for My Rose"
Chart (1969)	Peak position
UK Melody Maker Top 30 Pop	10
UK New Musical Express Top 30 Britain	9
UK Record Retailer Singles Chart	10

Weekly chart performance for Eddie Fisher's "I'll Pick a Rose for My Rose"
Chart (April 1969)	Peak position
US Record World Singles Coming Up	140
