= You Ain't Heard Nothin' Yet =

Studio album by Eddie Fisher
- Released: September 27, 1968
- Genre: Vocal pop
- Length: 31:04
- Language: English
- Label: RCA Victor
- Producer: Al Schmitt

Eddie Fisher chronology
People Like You (1967)	You Ain't Heard Nothin' Yet (1968)	After All (1984)

Professional ratings
Review scores
Source	Rating
Billboard	4/5 stars
AllMusic	3/5 stars
The Encyclopedia of Popular Music	2/5 stars

You Ain't Heard Nothin' Yet is a tribute album to entertainer Al Jolson, released by American singer Eddie Fisher in late 1968. It was his last RCA Victor Records album.

== Background ==
After "Now I Know" barely charted, (having just done well on the Billboard Easy Listening chart, and barely reaching the pop charts), Eddie Fisher started his last project, a tribute album to singer and actor Al Jolson. Even before You Ain't Heard Nothin' Yet, he showed his affection for Jolson with his Mame cuts, which were recorded for his People Like You album in 1967. He also performed his songs in shows and included some of his songs in his only live album, Eddie Fisher at the Winter Garden, 7 of the songs that he sang in the album would be recorded in the studio this time.

Fisher's family and other people actually used to call Fisher "Sonny Boy", a song of Jolson's, which appeared on the album and was highlighted as a pick by magazines who reviewed the album.

== Release ==
The album was released in late 1968, and it was considered unsuccessful; it didn't chart, didn't sell. Fisher's recording career was short from this point on, with his final single coming the next year. The album's name comes from the marketing of Jolson’s sound films, particularly The Jazz Singer (1927), which is considered the first feature-length “talkie” with synchronized sound. The LP's producer was independent record producer Al Schmitt. Fisher, dissatisfied with RCA Victor's lack of promotion of the album, left the label soon after. This would be Fisher's final album for two decades, until he came back to recording in 1984, with his final album named After All.

== Reception ==
The album received a positive critical reception upon its release. Cashbox magazine believed that Eddie Fisher "demonstrates that he hasn't lost any of the vocal magic that first brought him to fame as he runs through a collection of his favorite tunes." Noting that "Should bring the chanter fans out in force". Record World wrote "Anybody who likes Eddie Fisher knows that the fellow is in love with the old Al Jolson songs. He does a healthy collection of them here-sometimes dipping into the Jolson gravel-throat." It was given a four-star rating by Billboard magazine as well.

Retrospectives weren't bad as well. William Ruhlmann on AllMusic stated that Fisher "had not quite re-established himself as a record-seller, so the tribute album was a risky project." Continuing that Fisher sang the songs "as himself, though he did not hesitate to throw in an occasional inflection or bit of phrasing that were Jolsonesque." Concluding "The result was an entertaining gloss on the work of 'The World's Greatest Entertainer' that made the case for Fisher as his spiritual heir," but noted "Unfortunately it had nothing to do with the pop music of 1968." The LP was given a two-star rating by The Encyclopedia of Popular Music as well.

== Track listing ==
Side one
No.	Title	Writer(s)	Length
1.	"Rock-a-Bye Your Baby with a Dixie Melody"	Sam M. Lewis; Jean Schwartz; Joe Young	2:37
2.	"Sonny Boy"	Lew Brown; Buddy DeSylva; Ray Henderson; Al Jolson	2:34
3.	"I Only Have Eyes for You"	Al Dubin; Harry Warren	2:55
4.	"You Made Me Love You"	Joseph McCarthy; James V. Monaco	3:00
5.	"When You Were Sweet Sixteen"	James Thornton	2:50
6.	"Swanee"	Irving Caesar; George Gershwin	2:32

Side two
No.	Title	Writer(s)	Length
7.	"My Mammy"	Walter Donaldson; Sam M. Lewis; Joe Young	2:34
8.	"April Showers"	Buddy DeSylva; Louis Silvers	2:24
9.	"Back in Your Own Backyard"	Dave Dreyer; Al Jolson; Billy Rose	3:11
10.	"Anniversary Song"	Saul Chaplin; Al Jolson	3:49
11.	"Let Me Sing and I'm Happy"	Irving Berlin	2:34
Total length:			31:04
