= I'm in the Mood for Love (Eddie Fisher album) =

Studio album by Eddie Fisher
- Released: 1952; 1955 (re-issue)
- Genre: Vocal Pop
- Label: RCA Victor

Eddie Fisher chronology
Eddie Fisher Sings (1952)	I'm in the Mood for Love (1952)	Christmas with Eddie Fisher (1952)

Professional ratings
Review scores
Source	Rating
The Encyclopedia of Popular Music	3/5 stars

I'm in the Mood for Love is a 1952 album by Eddie Fisher, reissued in 1955, featuring the song of the same name. It was issued as a 10-inch long-playing record by RCA Victor Records. The Toledo Blade said that the album has songs that will delight anyone.

== Charts ==
The album debuted on the Billboard Best Selling Popular Record Albums chart in the issue dated November 8, 1952, and remained on the chart for 15 weeks, peaking at number three.

== Other releases ==
In 2002, the album, with Eddie Fisher Sings and Christmas With Eddie Fisher, was issued on a compact disc.

== Track listing ==
1. "I'm in the Mood for Love" (Jimmy McHugh/Dorothy Fields)
2. "You'll Never Know" (Harry Warren/Mack Gordon)
3. "Hold Me" (Jack Little/David Oppenheim/Ira Schuster)
4. "Everything I Have Is Yours" (Burton Lane/Harold Adamson)
5. "That Old Feeling" (Sammy Fain/Lew Brown)
6. "Full Moon and Empty Arms" (Buddy Kaye/Ted Mossman)
7. "Paradise" (Nacio Herb Brown/Gordon Clifford)
8. "I've Got You Under My Skin" (Cole Porter)
