= Outside of Heaven =

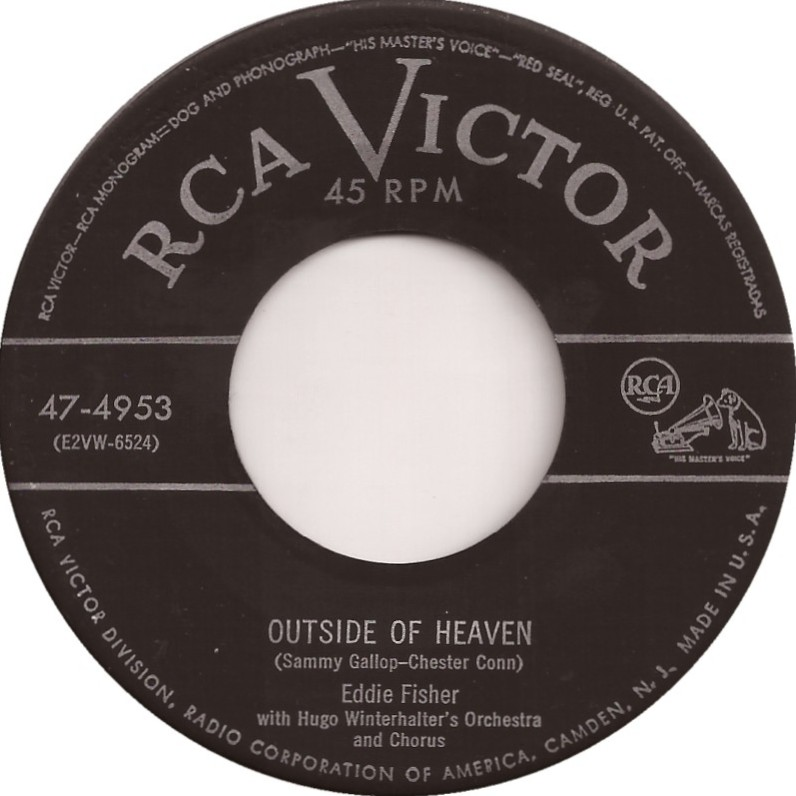

Single by Eddie Fisher with Hugo Winterhalter's Orchestra and Chorus
- B-side: "Lady of Spain"
- Published: August 28, 1952
- Released: September 27, 1952
- Recorded: July 19, 1952
- Studio: Manhattan Center, New York City
- Genre: Ballad
- Length: 2:36
- Label: RCA Victor
- Composer: Chester Conn
- Lyricist: Sammy Gallop
- Producer: Hugo Winterhalter

Eddie Fisher with Hugo Winterhalter's Orchestra and Chorus singles chronology
"Full Moon And Empty Arms" (1952)	"Outside of Heaven" (1952)	"Silent Night" (1952)

"Outside of Heaven" is a popular music song written by Sammy Gallop and Chester Conn. A recording by Eddie Fisher with Hugo Winterhalter's orchestra and chorus was made at Manhattan Center, New York City, on July 19, 1952, produced by Winterhalter. It was issued by RCA Victor with the catalog number 20-4953 (in the USA) and by EMI Records (in the UK) on the His Master's Voice label as catalog number B 10362.

== Chart performance ==
In America, the recording made No. 8 on the Billboard charts. Fisher's version reached No. 1 on the UK Singles Chart in 1953. "Outside of Heaven" was the first UK hit for Fisher, and only the fourth single to top the, then fledgling, UK chart.

On the UK's sheet music sales chart, "Outside of Heaven" first charted on 13 December 1952, peaking at No. 2 in a 23-week chart run. There, Fisher's was amongst the first issued recordings of the song, in November 1952, alongside versions by Vera Lynn, Margaret Whiting and David Carey. Cover versions by Fred Waring and his Pennsylvanians (with vocal by Joe Marine), Gerry Brereton, and Victor Silvester and his Ballroom Orchestra were subsequently released. Fisher's was the only version to make the UK's singles chart, and reached the top spot in its fifth week on chart.

Alberto Semprini, on pianoforte with rhythm accompaniment, recorded it as the third melody of the medley "Dancing to the piano (No. 19) - Hit medley of waltzes" along with "The Love of My Life" and "Waltzing the Blues" in London on January 14, 1953. It was released by EMI on the His Master's Voice label as catalogue number B 10441.

== See also ==
- List of UK singles chart number ones of the 1950s
