= Wish You Were Here (1952 song) =

Song
- Released: 1952
- Songwriter: Harold Rome

"Wish You Were Here" is a popular song with music and lyrics by Harold Rome, the title tune from his 1952 show, Wish You Were Here. It was introduced in the show and on the RCA Victor cast album by Jack Cassidy.

The best-known version was recorded by Eddie Fisher becoming a No.1 hit in 1952 on RCA Victor 47-4830 (45 rpm) and 20-4830 (78 rpm). It was ranked at number 7 on Billboard magazine's top popular songs of 1952 by retail sales.

== Other recordings ==
- Guy Lombardo & His Royal Canadians (vocal by Kenny Martin) (1952). This charted briefly in the No. 26 position.
- Judy Garland - Performed on The Bing Crosby Radio Hour on October 30, 1952.
- Jane Froman (1952). This charted briefly in the No. 25 spot.
- Jimmy Young (1953).
- Kate Smith - for her album The Fabulous Kate (1958).
- Peggy Lee – recorded it for her album Latin ala Lee! (1960)
- Michael Feinstein - for his album Forever (1993).
