= Games That Lovers Play (album) =

Studio album by Eddie Fisher
- Released: November 1966
- Genre: Vocal pop
- Length: 34 minutes 27 seconds
- Language: English
- Labels: RCA Victor; LPM/LSP 3726
- Producer: Al Schmitt

Eddie Fisher chronology
Young and Foolish (1965)	Games That Lovers Play (1966)	People Like You (1967)

Games That Lovers Play is an album recorded by the American singer Eddie Fisher in 1966, following the success of his "Games That Lovers Play" single. It was Eddie Fisher's 14th album.

== Background ==
By 1966, Eddie Fisher's chart performance had waned. Mainly due to his drug use, financial problems, and scandals, although he could still score minor pop hits. The year had seen no hits for Fisher, and Dot Records eventually dropped him. Despite these failures, his longtime label RCA Records signed him once again. His last single of 1966 was titled "Games That Lovers Play", and it returned him to the pop and easy listening charts soon afterwards. Subsequently, Fisher recorded an album with the same name, arranged by Nelson Riddle and Eddie Samuels as the pianist.

== Chart performance ==
The lead single, "Games That Lovers Play", debuted on the Billboard Hot 100 chart on October 29, 1966, and peaked at number 45 during a nine-week stay on the chart. The song spent a week at number two on the magazine's Easy Listening chart, during its 14-week stay. It reached number 41 on the Cashbox singles chart and stayed on the chart for nine weeks.

Games That Lovers Play debuted on the Billboard Top LPs chart in the issue dated November 26, 1966, and remained on the chart for ten weeks, peaking at number 72. It debuted on the Cashbox Top 100 Albums chart in the issue dated November 26, 1966, remaining on that chart for a total of eight weeks and peaking at number 70. It was his best selling album. The album debuted on the Record World 100 Top LPs chart in the issue dated December 3, 1966, and remained on the chart for ten weeks, but was ranked much higher at number 53.

== Reception ==
Professional ratings
Review scores
Source	Rating
AllMusic	4/5 stars
The Encyclopedia of Popular Music	2/5 stars

The initial Cashbox review said that the album was a "warm and tender offering of tunes from Eddie Fisher", and stated that it "Should go well with the artist’s fans." Record World stated that "Fisher releases an album of beautiful songs. And he sings them beautifully." Noting that "the old and new are here in a mixture of 'Yesterday,' 'You're Devastating,' 'How Insensitive,' and 'Where's that Rainbow?'". Billboard magazine believed that Fisher was "at his best and enhanced further by the superb arrangements of Nelson Riddle," with the LP. They described the material as "an exceptional array of current pop tunes adding to the programming and sales potential."

William Ruhlmann of AllMusic said the album showed that "Fisher was equally at home with an Antonio Carlos Jobim samba ("How Insensitive [Insensatez]," "Once I Loved"), a Rodgers & Hart standard ("Where's That Rainbow," "It Never Entered My Mind"), or a contemporary ballad (the Beatles' "Yesterday"), but gave special attention to songs like "Carnival (Manha de Carnaval)" and "Lara's Theme (Somewhere My Love)" that had sweeping melodies and a touch of melancholy.

== Track listing ==
Side one
No.	Title	Writer(s)	Length
1.	"Games That Lovers Play (Eine Ganze Nacht)"	James Last, Günter Loose, Eddie Snyder	2:33
2.	"Where's That Rainbow?"	Lorenz Hart, Richard Rodgers	3:01
3.	"Carnival (Manha de Carnaval)"	Luiz Bonfá, Luigi Creatore, Hugo Peretti, George David Weiss	3:47
4.	"Lara's Theme (Somewhere My Love)"	Maurice Jarre, Paul Francis Webster	3:15
5.	"It Never Entered My Mind"	Lorenz Hart, Richard Rodgers	2:47
6.	"Just Let Me Look at You"	Dorothy Fields, Jerome Kern	2:50

Side two
No.	Title	Writer(s)	Length
7.	"Yesterday"	John Lennon, Paul McCartney	2:45
8.	"How Insensitive (Insensatez)"	Norman Gimbel, Antônio Carlos Jobim, Vinícius de Moraes	3:07
9.	"I Get Along Without You Very Well"	Hoagy Carmichael	3:46
10.	"Once I Loved"	Ray Gilbert, Antônio Carlos Jobim, Vinícius de Moraes	3:15
11.	"You're Devastating"	Otto Harbach, Jerome Kern	3:14
Total length:			34:27

== Production ==
Recorded in RCA Victor's Music Center of the World, Hollywood, California.

== Charts ==
=== Album ===
Chart (1966–1967)	Peak position
U.S. Top LPs (Billboard)	72
U.S. Top 100 Albums (Cashbox)	70
U.S. 100 Top LPs (Record World)	53

=== Singles ===
Year	Title	US AC	US Cashbox	US Hot 100
1966	"Games That Lovers Play"	2	41	45

== Personnel ==
All credits are adapted from the liner notes of Games That Lovers Play.

- Al Schmitt – producer
- Nelson Riddle – arranger, conductor
- Dick Bogert – recording engineer
- Eddie Samuels – pianist
- Ken Whitmore – photographer
- Eddie Fisher – vocals
