= Thinking of You (1927 song) =

Song by Mary Eaton and Oscar Shaw

from the album The Five O'Clock Girl
- Released: 1927
- Songwriter: Bert Kalmar
- Composer: Harry Ruby

"Thinking of You" is a popular song, composed by Harry Ruby with lyrics by Bert Kalmar. It was introduced in the Broadway show, The Five O'Clock Girl (1927) when it was sung by Mary Eaton and Oscar Shaw.

== Overview ==
The song had two special periods of popularity: 1928 and 1950, the latter in relation to the release of the Metro-Goldwyn-Mayer film, Three Little Words, based on the life of Kalmar and Ruby. In the film, Vera-Ellen (dubbed by Anita Ellis) sings the song which then develops into a major dance routine with Fred Astaire. Hit versions of the song were recorded by Eddie Fisher and Don Cherry.

== Notable recordings ==
The recording by Don Cherry was released by Decca Records as catalog number 27128. It first reached the Billboard Best Seller chart on September 15, 1950, and lasted 21 weeks on the chart, peaking at number four.

The recording by Eddie Fisher was released by RCA Victor as catalog number 20-3901 (78 r.p.m.) and 47-3901 (45 r.p.m). It first reached the Billboard Best Seller chart on October 6, 1950, and lasted 18 weeks on the chart, peaking at number five. On the Cashbox singles chart it peaked at number three. This was Fisher's first charting hit.

Cherry re-recorded the song for his album, There Goes My Everything in 1967.

== Other recorded versions ==
- Ruth Etting
- Harry Archer and his Orchestra (vocal: Franklyn Baur) - recorded on October 27, 1927 for Brunswick Records (catalog No. 3704).
- Les Baxter with his Orchestra and Chorus for the Capitol LP Thinking of You (1954).
- Connie Francis - recorded in 1959 for a proposed album called One for the Boys which was not issued. The song was later included in the Bear Family Records compilation White Sox, Pink Lipstick...And Stupid Cupid (1993).
- Carlos Molina and his Orchestra, recorded for Columbia Records on February 11, 1936 (catalog No. 3122D).
- Dorothy Provine - Great version of this song on a Roaring Twenties TV show album The Vamp of the Roaring 20's - Vol. 2 (1961).
- Ben Selvin's Broadway Nitelites (vocal by Franklyn Baur) - recorded on October 25, 1927 for Columbia Records (catalog No. 1164D).
- Nathaniel Shilkret and The Victor Orchestra (vocal: Lewis James) - recorded on September 29, 1927 for Victor (catalog No. 20996B).
- Martha Tilton - recorded for Coral Records in 1950.
- Sarah Vaughan - recorded on July 1, 1950 for Columbia Records (catalog No. 38925).
