= Young and Foolish =

Song by Albert Hague
- Released: 1954
- Genre: Jazz
- Songwriter: Arnold B. Horwitt

"Young and Foolish" is a popular song with music by Albert Hague and lyrics by Arnold B. Horwitt, published in 1954.

The song was introduced in the musical Plain and Fancy (1955–56), and has been recorded by many singers since.

== Recorded versions ==
- Eddie Fisher's version reached No. 25 on the Billboard Easy Listening chart in 1965.
- Tony Bennett recorded the song for the album The Tony Bennett/Bill Evans Album (1975)
- Bing Crosby recorded the song in 1955 for use on his radio show; it was subsequently included in the box set The Bing Crosby CBS Radio Recordings (1954–56) issued by Mosaic Records (catalog MD7-245) in 2009.
- Bill Evans' rendition appears on his 1959 album Everybody Digs Bill Evans
- Gogi Grant's recorded it for her album Torch Time (1959).
- Ronnie Hilton's version reached No. 17 on the UK Singles Chart in 1956.
- Edmund Hockridge reached No. 10 in the UK with his version from 1956.
- Richard "Groove" Holmes recorded "Young and Foolish" for his 1973 album Night Glider
- Dean Martin's version reached the No. 20 spot in the UK chart in 1956.
- Johnny Mathis's version appears on his album Love Is Everything (1965)
- Oscar Peterson included a version of "Young and Foolish" on his album Finest Hour.
- Jo Stafford released a recording of the song as a single in 1955. It peaked at No. 8 in Australia.
- Nancy Wilson's recorded a version for her album From Broadway with Love (1966).
