= Eddie Fisher Today! =

Studio album by Eddie Fisher
- Released: June 1965
- Recorded: May 1965
- Genre: Vocal pop
- Length: 33 minutes 8 seconds
- Labels: Dot Records; DLP 3631
- Producer: Randy Wood

Eddie Fisher chronology
Eddie Fisher at the Winter Garden (1963)	Eddie Fisher Today! (1965)	When I Was Young (1965)

Singles from Eddie Fisher Today!
- 1. "Sunrise, Sunset" Released: April 1965

Professional ratings
Review scores
Source	Rating
The Encyclopedia of Popular Music	2/5 stars

Eddie Fisher Today! was Eddie Fisher's debut album for Dot Records, released in June 1965. The album marked Fisher's return to the pop charts and received a positive reception.

== Background ==
By 1965, Eddie Fisher's sales and chart performance of singles and albums had waned. RCA Victor Records had dropped him at the start of the decade, and Fisher created his own record label named Ramrod Records. It had seen only one successful release with a live album. In early 1965, he signed Dot Records, with whom his first release was scheduled to be the single "Sunrise, Sunset", from Fiddler on the Roof. The song was heavily promoted, with Dot buying out advertisements and Fisher performing it on multiple shows, notably The Ed Sullivan Show. Whilst seeing an international release, it had charted only in the US, reaching No. 119 on the Billboard Hot 100 and the Cashbox Top 100 Singles charts, marking a return to them.

== Release and reception ==
Eddie Fisher Today! saw Fisher return to recording a full LP for the first time in three years. It was released in June by Dot Records with the catalogue number DLP 3631. It was his first charting studio album in 10 years. The LP mainly consisted of covers of hit songs from 1964 and 1965, and the aforementioned single. The cover art was drawn by Sandy Dvore, and the orchestra and chorus was conducted by Pete King. The producer was Randy Wood.

Billboard magazine had put the album in their category "The Greatest Talent On Record". Their review of the LP stated that "The original power and vitality of Fisher as a ballad singer is intact here," and believed that it is "By far one of the finest efforts of his career". Record World magazine seemed to agree, also stating that "This is certainly Eddie's finest recording job to date." Their review said that it's "a beautiful package with just the right material and just the right singing," noting that the "Crooner has really matured over the years and turns in a deep and restrained job with near definitive versions of 'Dear Heart,' 'Once Upon a Time' and others."

With some sales momentum from the LP, Dot Records started rushing out Fisher's next album, When I Was Young, which featured re-recordings of his RCA Victor hits. It was released two months after Eddie Fisher Today!.

== Chart performance ==
The album debuted on Billboard magazine's Top LP's chart in the issue dated July 24, 1965, peaking at No. 52 during a ten-week run on the chart. The album debuted on Cash Box magazine's Top 100 Albums chart in the issue dated July 17, 1965, but was ranked lower at No. 74 during an eleven-week run on the chart. On the Record World magazine charts, the album peaked at a higher No. 50 in September of that year.

== Track listing ==
Side one
No.	Title	Lyrics	Length
1.	"Sunrise, Sunset"	Sheldon Harnick	2:23
2.	"Who Can I Turn To?"	Leslie Bricusse and Anthony Newley	2:51
3.	"Red Roses for a Blue Lady"	Sid Tepper and Roy C. Bennett (alias Roy Brodsky)	2:25
4.	"Hello, Dolly!"	Jerry Herman	2:33
5.	"Try to Remember"	Tom Jones	2:36
6.	"Call Me Irresponsible"	Sammy Cahn	3:15

Side two
No.	Title	Lyrics	Length
7.	"People"	Jule Styne and Bob Merrill	2:34
8.	"Downtown"	Tony Hatch	2:53
9.	"If I Loved You"	Oscar Hammerstein II	2:41
10.	"Once Upon a Time"	Clarence Paul, Barney Ales, Dave Hamilton and William "Mickey" Stevenson	2:56
11.	"Dear Heart"	Henry Mancini, Ray Evans and Jay Livingston	2:31
12.	"What Now My Love"	Carl Sigman	3:27
Total length:			33:08

== Charts ==
Chart performance for Eddie Fisher Today!
Chart (1965)	Peak position
US Billboard Top LPs	52
US Cash Box Top 100 Albums	74
US Record World 100 Top LP's	50

== Bibliography ==
- Whitburn, Joel (1973). "Top LPs, 1955–1972". Record Research.
- Hoffmann, Frank W. (1988). "The Cash box album charts, 1955-1974". Archive.org. Metuchen, N.J. : Scarecrow Press.
- Larkin, Colin (2007). "The Encyclopedia of Popular Music". Omnibus Press. p. 535. ISBN 9781846098567.
