= William Lambton =

British geographer (1753–1823)

William Lambton FRS
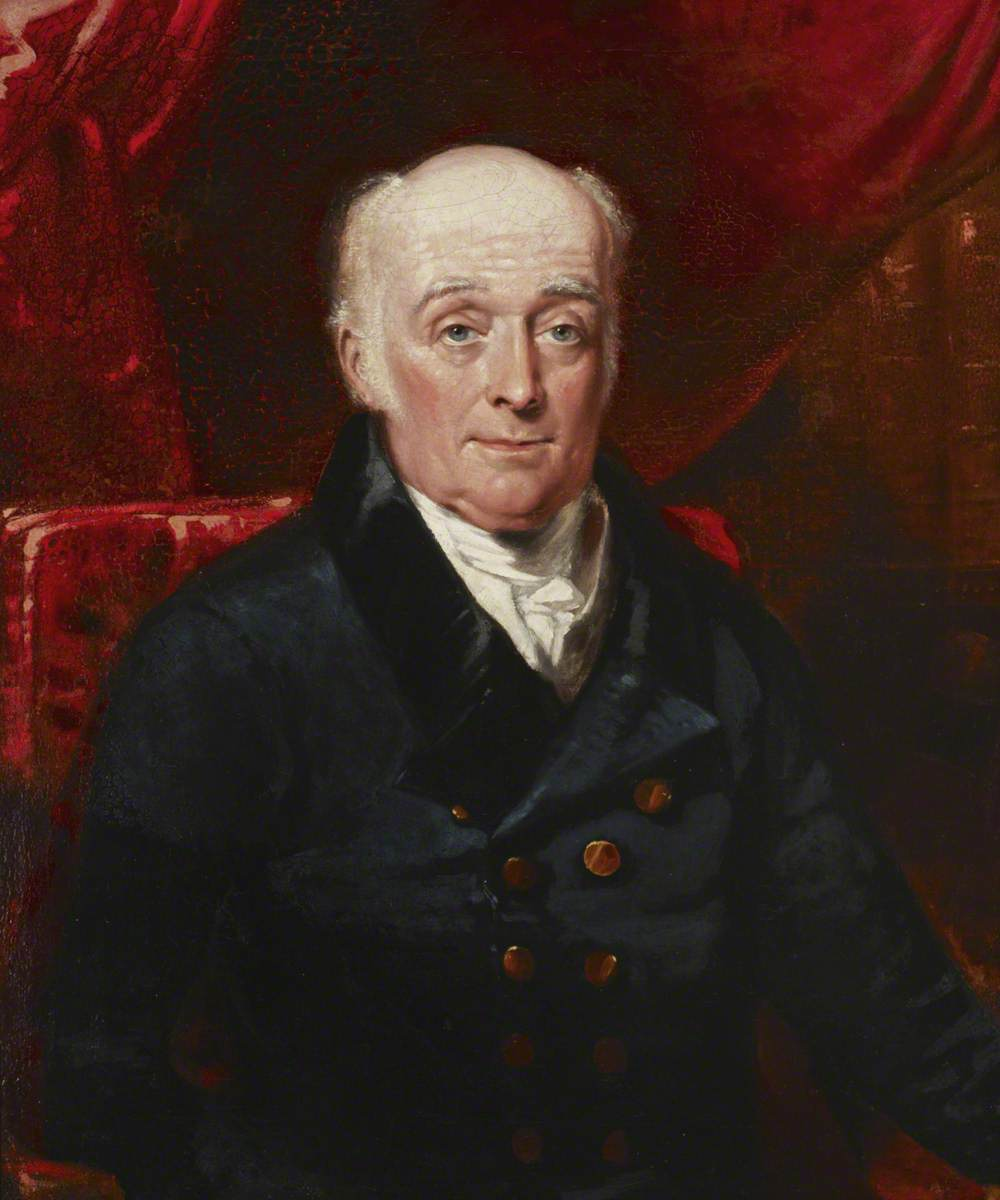
- Lambton in 1822, oil painting by William Havell in the Royal Asiatic Society
- Born: 1753; Crosby Grange
- Died: January 1823 (aged 70); Hinganghat
- Occupations: Engineer, surveyor
- Known for: Founding Superintendent of the Great Trigonometric Survey

Lieutenant-Colonel William Lambton FRS (c. 1753 – 20 or 26 January 1823) was an English soldier, surveyor, and geographer who began a triangulation survey in 1800-1802 that was later called the Great Trigonometrical Survey of India. His initial survey was to measure the length of a degree of an arc of the meridian so as to establish the shape of the Earth and support a larger scale trigonometrical survey across the width of the peninsula of India between Madras and Mangalore. After triangulating across the peninsula, he continued surveys northwards for more than twenty years. He died during the course of the surveys in central India and is buried at Hinganghat in Wardha district of Maharashtra. He was succeeded by his assistant George Everest.

== Life ==
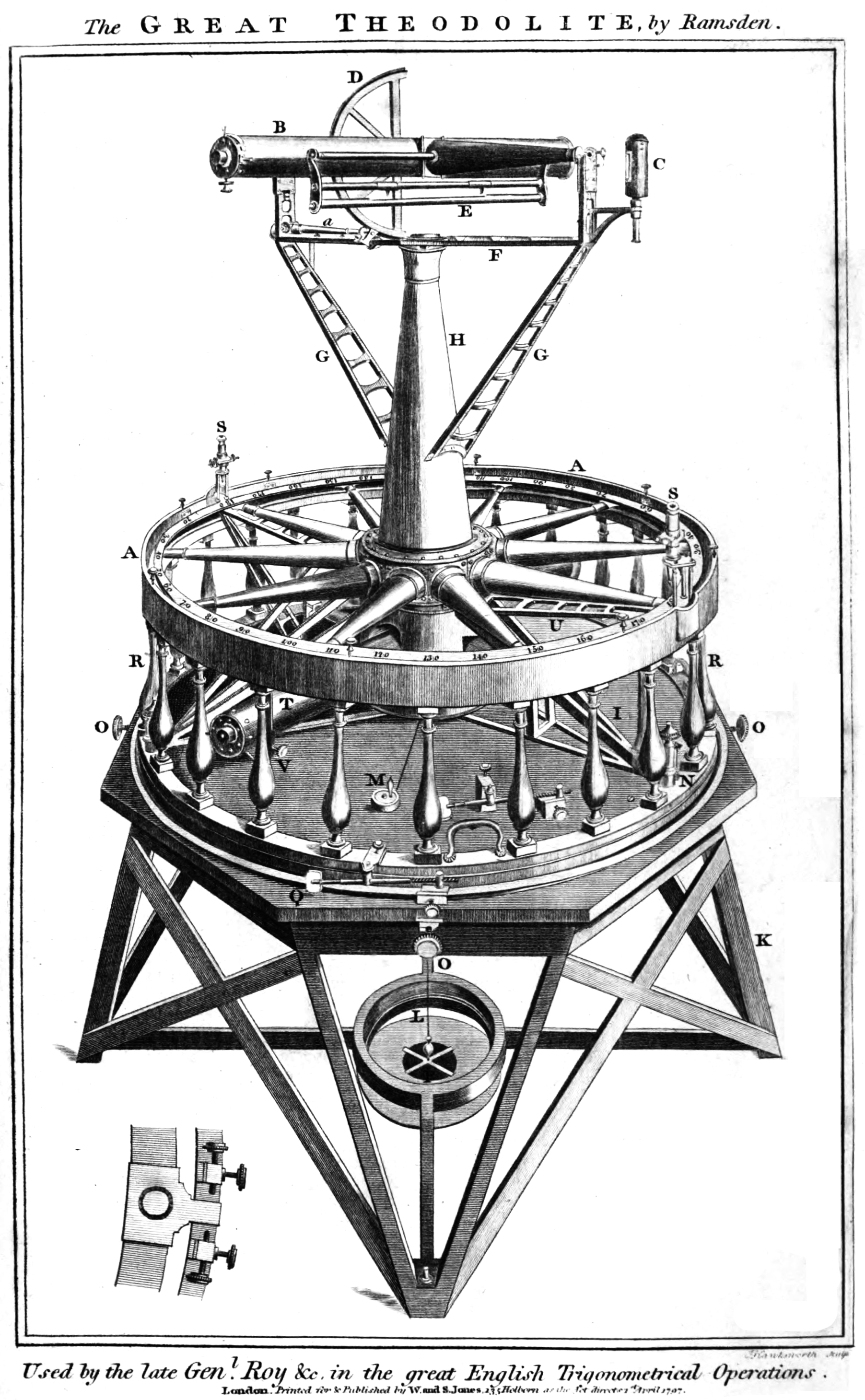
Great Theodolite by Jesse Ramsden, similar to the one made by William Cary that was used by Lambton in the early surveys.

Lambton was born around 1753 (1756 according to some sources) at Crosby Grange, near Northallerton, in North Yorkshire, the son of a farmer. He was extremely reserved about the details of his family. Even the year of birth is speculated on the basis of an incident he recounted of a dinner in Madikeri in 1803 hosted by Veer Rajender Wadeer, the ruler of the province of Coorg. The Coorg Raja made all present declare their age and Lambton is said to have mentioned his as fifty. For many years he spent a substantial portion of his salary to support his parents, from which it has been suggested that he came from humble origins. He often mentioned a mathematics teacher at school by the name of Emerson. His skill in mathematics earned him a place in a grammar school at Northallerton, and he studied under Dr. Charles Hutton. He also studied at Newcastle-on-Tyne.

On 28 March 1781, Lambton was appointed ensign in Lord Fauconberg's regiment of foot, and transferred to the 33rd Regiment of Foot under Arthur Wellesley to the Cape in 1796 and later to Bengal and Madras (1798). His ability at surveying led to work on measuring land for settlers in America. He spent most of his earning to support his parents. With his regiment he took part in the American War of Independence and was taken prisoner at Yorktown. Observing a solar eclipse through the telescope of a theodolite without darkened glasses led to the burning of the retina of his left eye. After this accident he obtained with the help of his friends, especially Sir Brook Watson, an appointment as barrack-master in New Brunswick with a salary of 400 pounds per year. He had considerable leisure during which he was able to lay, in his words, "...the foundation of that knowledge, which was one day to bring him to the notice of the world." He was appointed barrack master in Nova Scotia and he spent many years studying mathematics on his own. In 1795 the Duke of York ordered that all civilian officers should be struck off from the regiments. Lambton then joined the 33rd at Calcutta after 13 years away from regimental duties. The 33rd Regiment was commanded by Sir Arthur Wellesley at Calcutta.

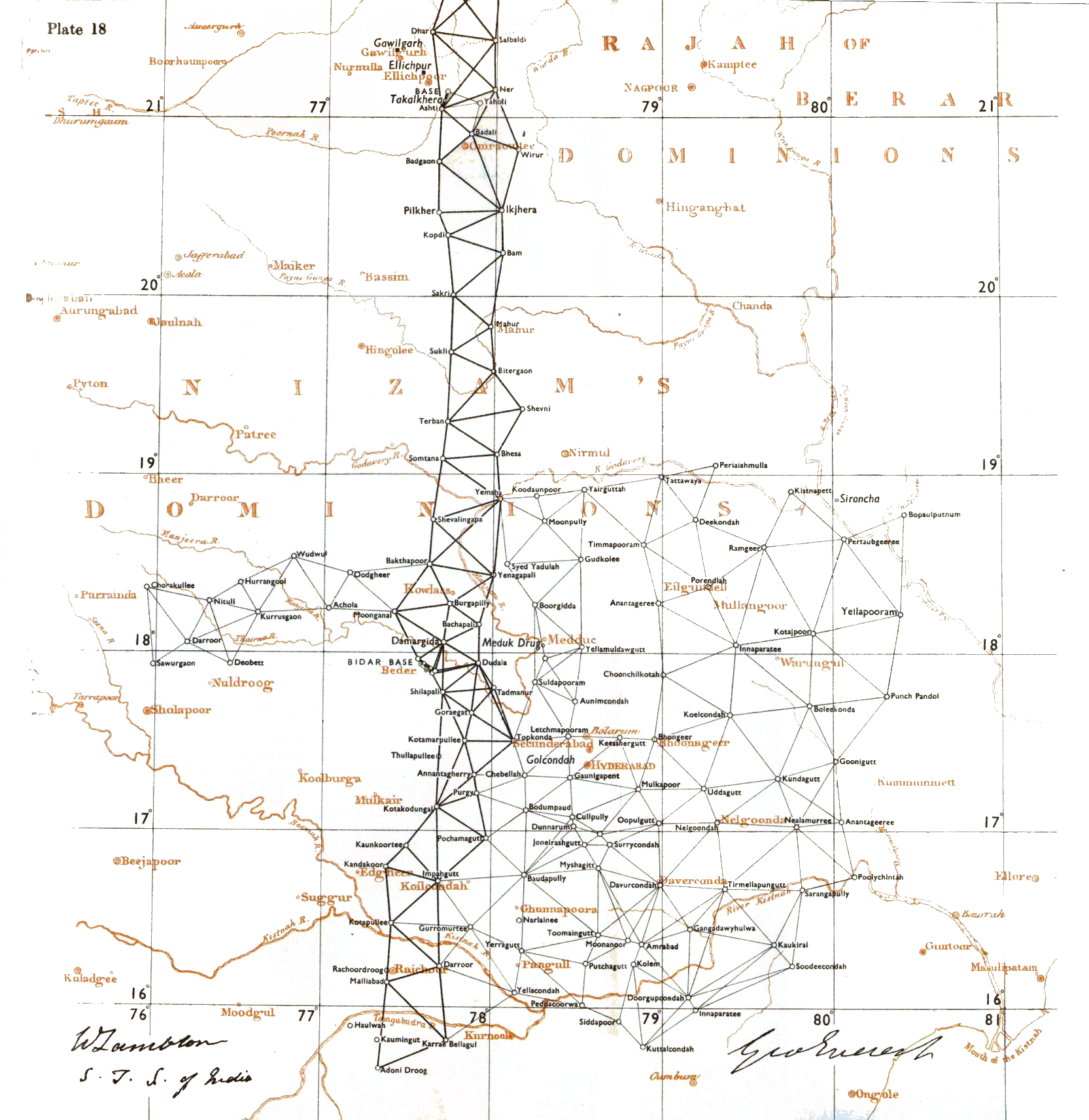
Triangulation map in central India signed by Lambton and Everest

In 1796, Lambton was promoted to Lieutenant and posted with his regiment to India, under the command of Colonel Arthur Wellesley. He took part in the Fourth Anglo-Mysore War in 1799. He was a brigade major during the Siege of Seringapatam where he led the left column after the fall of his superiors. He was also able to demonstrate his skills in navigating by the stars during the campaign and had prevented a critical error when General Baird was headed in the wrong direction while attempting to get around Tipu's camp at night. After the capture of Mysore, Lambton proposed to Wellesley that the territory be surveyed, using the new techniques of geodesy employed by William Roy in Great Britain. Lambton's proposal to conduct the survey was nearly blocked by Major James Rennel, who declared that it was not needed since Colonel Colin Mackenzie was already undertaking a similar survey.

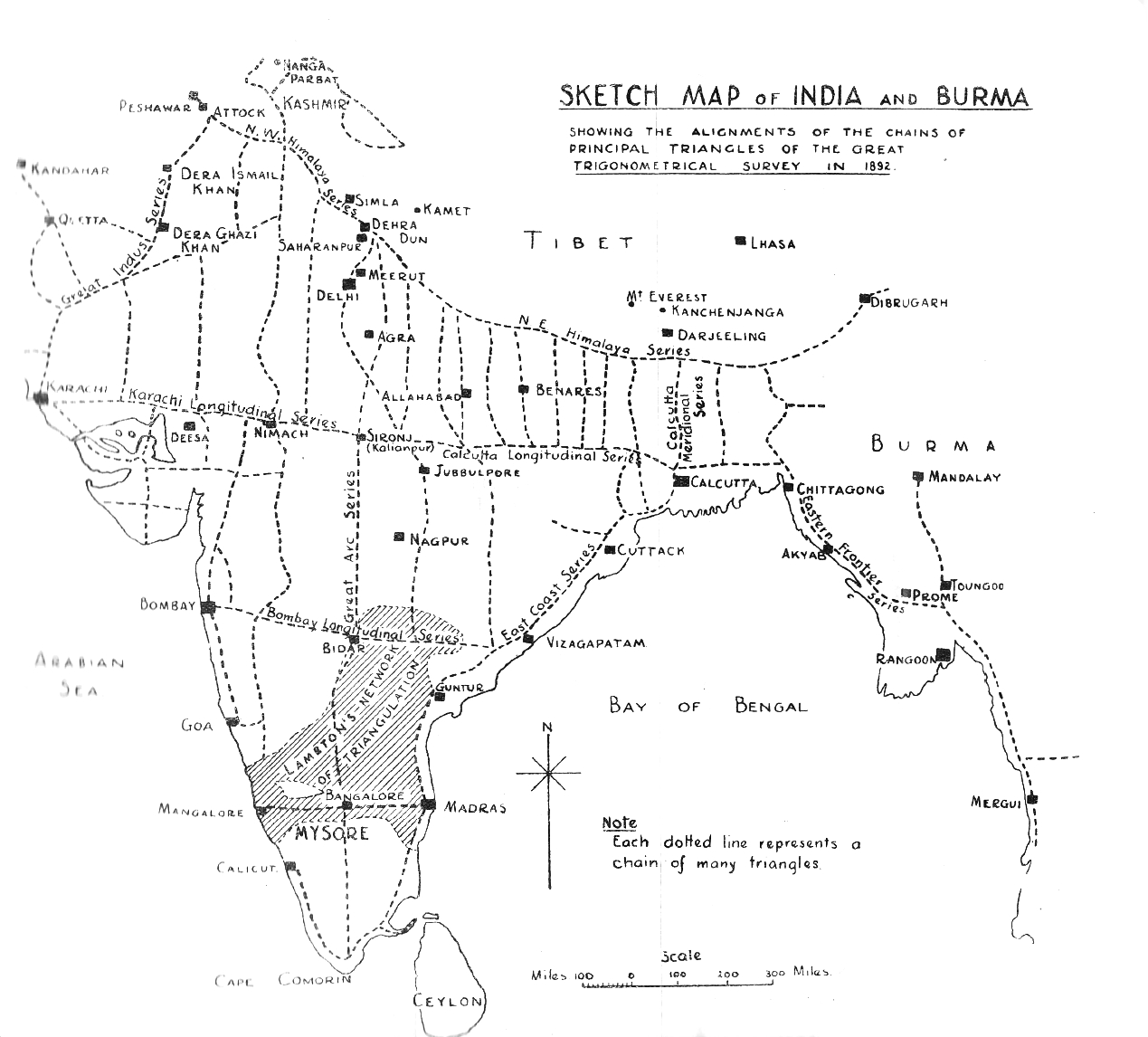
Lambton's area of work

Lambton's proposal was however examined by Nevil Maskelyne, Astronomer Royal and a relative of Lord Clive. Maskelyne saw the scientific value of the survey and pointed out to Rennel that he had been misinformed and gave his support to the project. Just around the time that Lambton got his survey approved by Lord Clive, he happened to hear of some instruments being carried back from China by astronomer Dr. James Dinwiddie. A set of instruments had been sent to China along with Dr. Dinwiddie but the Chinese Emperor had not shown interest and the equipment was returned. Lambton was able to examine the instruments when Dinwiddie broke journey at Fort William. The instruments included a zenith sector (an upward pointing telescope with measuring instruments) of 5 feet (1.5 m) radius, a Ramsden chain, leveling instrument, and a chronometer. Lambton also ordered an altitude and azimuth circle with a theodolite. The equipment arrived in 1801. Although a baseline was measured in Bangalore between October and December 1800, this appears to have been rejected (it was not connected to the triangulations) and another baseline was made in 1804 (using better equipment and on better terrain) to compare with the Madras baseline, whose measurement began on 10 April 1802 from St. Thomas Mount and was completed with 7.5 miles (12.1 km) measured by 22 May 1802. They then triangulated their way to Bangalore where the 1804 baseline was measured by John Warren to check the survey accuracy (also examining the errors introduced by refraction). The triangulation extended west to end at Mangalore. In 1806 he began his latitudinal measurement 100 miles (160 km) northwards from Bangalore, where the British territory ended. He then surveyed southwards to Cape Comorin. Lambton then recommenced the survey northwards until his death. He died at Hinganghat, and the exact date of death is not known but is either 20th as recorded by most contemporary newspapers or 26 January 1823. A memorial was erected by the Resident of Nagpur, Richard Jenkins.

Lambton had three acknowledged children through an Indian mistress named Kumerboo. One of them was also named William Lambton while another possibly died in infancy. He had another daughter and son through another woman Frances, possibly a Franco-Indian or Anglo-Indian. A William Lambton junior joined the Survey in 1815.

== Surveys ==
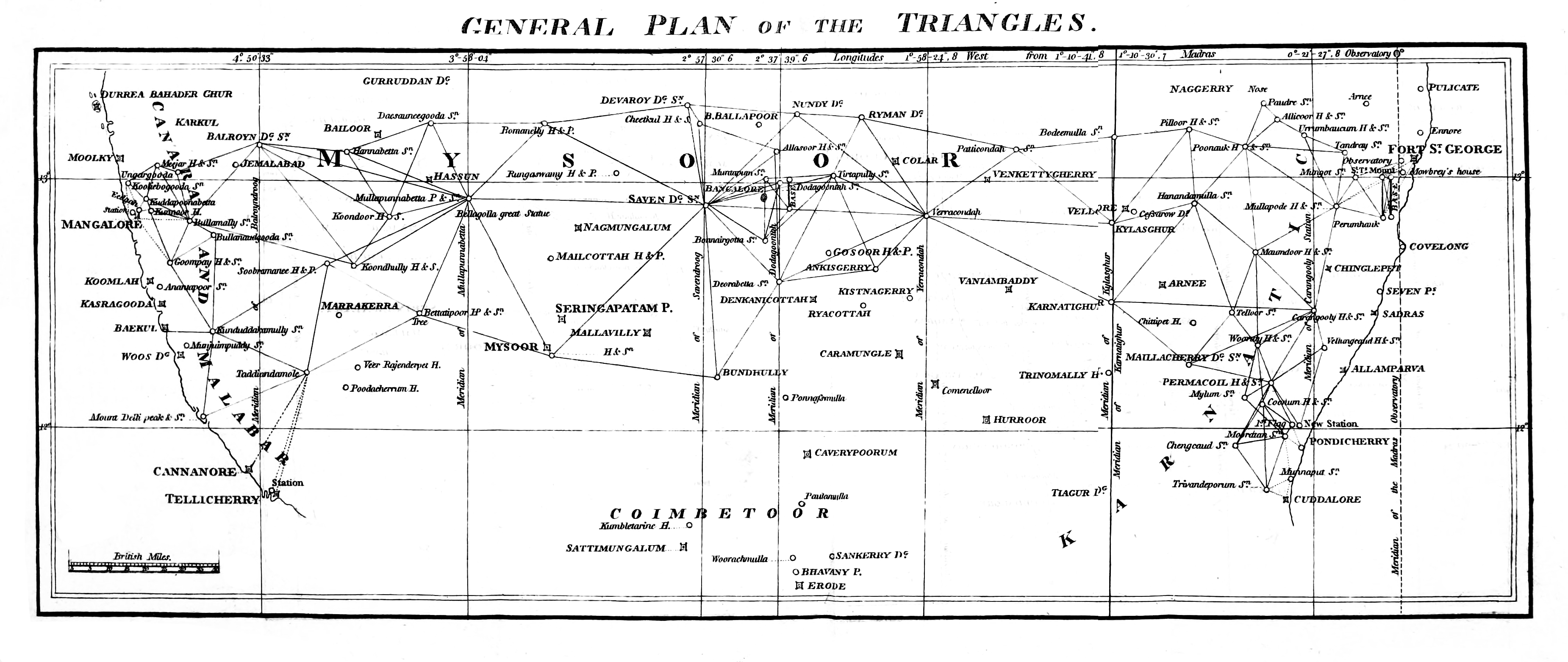
The first triangulations across the peninsula

Around the time that Lambton proposed a triangulation survey of the peninsula of India, Colonel Colin Mackenzie had already begun a topographical survey of the Mysore region. Mackenzie was later designated as the Surveyor General. Lambton, with his support from Lord Clive, however, did not have to report to Mackenzie and it has been suggested that Mackenzie felt undermined. Their correspondence however showed cordial relations being maintained. The triangulation survey was officially given the name of Great Trigonometrical Survey only in 1818. Lambton essentially followed a system established in England by General Roy for the Principal Triangulation of Great Britain. Lambton's initial aim was to measure the arc of a meridian so as to establish the shape of the Earth. Lambton did not wish to assume any specific theoretical shape and preferred to make exact measurements. In the earliest surveys conducted in Bangalore he noted:

But should the earth prove to be neither an ellipsoid, nor a figure generated by any particular curve, of known properties, but a figure whose meridional section is bounded by no law of curvature, then we can obtain nothing until we have an actual measurement, to be applied as has been already mentioned.

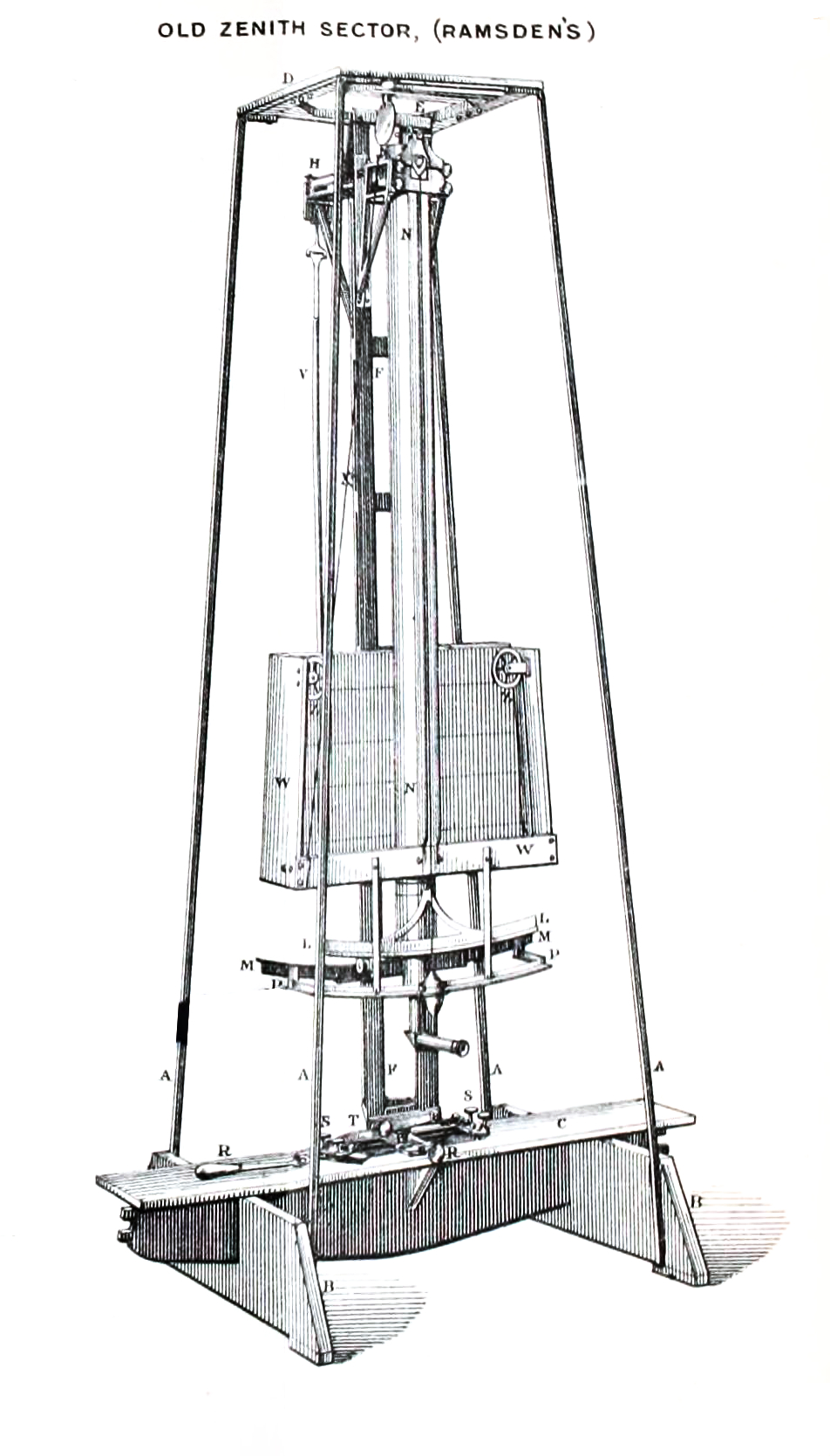
Ramsden's Zenith Sector used for determining latitude

The Bangalore baseline of 1800 made use of a chain laid in long coffers supported on pickets and the heads were aligned using a telescope. The ground chosen was not appropriate and this early baseline measurement had to be dropped. The equipment needed for careful survey arrived only in 1801. The subsequent baselines including were made more carefully with the use of a Ramsden's chain specially calibrated for tropical temperatures, consisting of 40 links of 2.5 feet (0.76 m) each and measuring 100 feet (30 m) at 62 °F (17 °C), and a boning telescope (a small, low-magnification telescope used for aligning the tops of survey poles). He took special precautions to account for the expansion of the chain under the Indian weather; and repeated measurements with rotations of the telescope of the Zenith sector so as to account for collimation errors in determining the latitude (the elevation of the pole star directly provides the latitude but owing to errors related to determining the horizon and from refraction, the preferred method in surveying was to use well known stars located closer to the zenith, such as Aldebaran for India, whose declination from the pole-star had been pre-established). Lambton's assistant John Warren investigated the effect of refraction on errors in calculating the latitudes.

The main survey instrument from 1802 for the primary triangles was a Great Theodolite made by William Cary. This was very similar to the instruments used in France and Britain for previous trigonometrical surveys. It had a horizontal circle that was 36 inches (91 cm) and the readings were taken using a microscope. The vertical graduated circle was 18 inches (46 cm) in diameter. It weighed about half a ton and needed twelve men to carry it. Lambton measured all three angles of triangles in several cases to establish the spherical excess (angles of triangles on a sphere sum up greater than 180°). When the survey was carried out from Madras to Bangalore, Lambton was able to compare the Bangalore baseline of 1804 with the calculated measurements and the difference was about 3.5 inches (8.9 cm).

== Honours ==
Lambton was made a Fellow of the Royal Society (9 January 1817) and a corresponding member of the French Academy of Sciences in 1817. A narrow ridge above the Bhavani valley along the Nilgiris is named after him, as Lambton's Peak Range. A commemorative bust was placed at St. Thomas Mount, Chennai, India in 2003.
