= L.A. Break Down =

Studio album by Jack Jones
- Released: December 27, 1968
- Recorded: Late 1968
- Studios: RCA Victor's Music Center of the World, Hollywood, California
- Genres: Vocal pop; Easy listening
- Length: 36 minutes 43 seconds
- Labels: RCA Victor (LSP 4108)
- Producer: Ernie Altschuler

Jack Jones chronology
| Where Is Love? (1968) | L.A. Break Down (1968) | A Time for Us (1969) |

Singles from L.A. Break Down
- 1. "L.A. Break Down (and Take Me In)" Released: Late November 1968; 2. "Love Story" Released: January 17, 1969

Alternative cover
- United Kingdom release cover

L.A. Break Down, also known as Love Story in the United Kingdom, is the twenty-sixth studio album by American pop vocalist Jack Jones, released in December 1968 by RCA Victor Records. The project included a mixture of cover songs of popular hits sung in an easy listening style. The album did not reach the US album charts, but received a fairly positive reception.

== Background and content ==
Jack Jones was a popular easy listening and pop singer in the 1960s, recording with Kapp Records and gaining several hits. Switching to RCA Victor in late 1967, he continued releasing charting materal. In late 1968 he scored another minor Billboard Easy Listening hit titled "L.A. Break Down (and Take Me In)". An album titled after it followed while the single was still on the charts.

The recordings for L.A Break Down were taken from sessions held in late 1968 at RCA Victor's Music Center of the World, Hollywood, California. The songs were arranged and conducted by Pat Williams. The piano is credited to Doug Talbert, who appeared in several albums by Jones, the earliest example being Jack Jones Sings. Only "But I Loved You" doesn't feature Talbert on the piano. The album consisted of 11 total tracks, with a runtime of over 36 minutes. The project included songs in an easy listening style like "Linda", composed by Randy Newman, originally appearing on his 1968 album Randy Newman. He was credited with composing and writing two other songs in the album, including the pop hit "I Think It's Goin' to Rain Today". One of the standards recorded for the LP was "'Round Midnight", written in 1943.

== Release and reception ==
Professional ratings
Review scores
| Source | Rating |
|---|---|
| The Encyclopedia of Popular Music | 4/5 stars |
| Cashbox | Positive (Pop Pick) |

L.A. Break Down was originally released in late December 1968 on the RCA Victor label. Retitled to Love Story in the United Kingdom, the album was released there with the identical track list the same month. It was the twenty-sixth, the first of the year, studio collection released in Jones' career. The album was distributed as a vinyl LP, containing six songs on side one and five on side two of the record. In January 1969, it was also issued as an 8-track cartridge by the same label. Decades later, the album was re-released on Geffen Records to digital and streaming sites.

The album received a positive critical reception upon its release. Cashbox reviewed the album on January 18, 1969, stating that "Jones' new album is a powerful venture that's bound to pull in heaps of spins and sales." They believed that "The ace chanter is at the top of his form on this one as he lends his warm, rich voice to a host of striking tunes. In addition to 'L. A. Break Down,' Jones sings 'Round Midnight,' 'Lost In The Stars," 'I Think It's Goin' To Rain Today,' and seven others." They called it a "Chart-bound set."

The Times Record stated that "L.A. Break Down is the new Jack," noting that he was "more the nightclub performer". The Anaheim Bulletin said that the album was "another buildup for the steadily improving vocalist". Peter Jones of Record Mirror said that Jones does the song "Love Story" in a "good but not outstanding" way, calling it "all a bit disjointed, served up this way.

== Chart performance and singles ==
The album itself failed to reach the US album charts. The title track was released as a single in November 1968, it debuted on the Billboard Bubbling Under Hot 100 on December 7, 1968, remaining on the chart for five weeks with a peak position of number 106. It became his last entry on the chart. "L.A. Break Down (and Take Me In)" was ranked higher on the Billboard Easy Listening survey, reaching number 21 during an eight-week run on it the next year. On the Record World Top-Non Rock survey, the track rose to a higher position as well, quickly going to number 20 during a nine-week run on the chart. "Love Story", which was later a hit for Peggy Lee, was released as a single in mid January 1969. It received a positive critical reception, but failed to reach the charts.

== Track listings ==
=== Vinyl version ===
Side one
| No. | Title | Writer(s) | Length |
|---|---|---|---|
| 1. | "L.A. Break Down (and Take Me In)" | Larry Marks | 4:15 |
| 2. | "Linda" | Randy Newman | 2:35 |
| 3. | "'Round Midnight" | Bernie Hanighen; Cootie Williams; Thelonious Monk | 3:09 |
| 4. | "Since I Fell for You" | Buddy Johnson | 2:51 |
| 5. | "You've Changed" | Bill Carey; Carl Fischer | 3:28 |
| 6. | "Good-Bye" | Gordon Jenkins | 2:32 |

Side two
| No. | Title | Writer(s) | Length |
|---|---|---|---|
| 7. | "Love Story" | Randy Newman | 3:52 |
| 8. | "Lost in the Stars" | Kurt Weill; Maxwell Anderson | 2:20 |
| 9. | "I Think It's Goin' to Rain Today" | Randy Newman | 3:13 |
| 10. | "My Man's Gone Now" | DuBose Heyward; George Gershwin | 4:02 |
| 11. | "But I Loved You" | Gordon Jenkins | 3:08 |

=== Digital version ===
L.A. Break Down (download and streaming)
| No. | Title | Writer(s) | Length |
|---|---|---|---|
| 1. | "L.A. Break Down (And Take Me In)" | Marks | 4:14 |
| 2. | "Linda" | Newman | 2:35 |
| 3. | "'Round Midnight" | Hanighen; Williams; Monk | 3:10 |
| 4. | "Since I Fell for You" | Johnson | 2:551 |
| 5. | "You've Changed" | Carey; Fischer | 3:30 |
| 6. | "Good-Bye" | Jenkins | 2:36 |
| 7. | "Love Story" | Newman | 3:59 |
| 8. | "Lost in the Stars" | Weill; Anderson | 2:22 |
| 9. | "I Think It's Goin' to Rain Today" | Newman | 3:15 |
| 10. | "My Man's Gone Now" | Heyward; Gershwin | 4:02 |
| 11. | "But I Loved You" | Jenkins | 3:10 |
| Total length: | | | 36:43 |

== Personnel ==
All credits are adapted from the liner notes of L.A. Break Down.

- Ernie Altschulter – producer
- Mickey Crofford – recording engineer
- Pat Williams – arranger and conductor
- Doug Talbert – piano
- Jack Jones – vocals

== Charts ==
Chart performance for the lead single "L.A. Break Down (and Take Me In)"
| Chart (1968–1969) | Peak position |
|---|---|
| US Billboard Bubbling Under Hot 100 | 106 |
| US Billboard Easy Listening | 21 |
| US Record World Top Non-Rock | 20 |

== Release history ==
Release history and formats for L.A. Break Down
| Region | Date | Format | Label | Ref. |
|---|---|---|---|---|
| North America and UK | December 27, 1968 | LP; Vinyl | RCA Victor Records | |
| United States | January 1969 | 8-track cartridge tape | RCA Victor Records | |
| Worldwide | Circa 2020 | Music download; streaming | Sony Music Entertainment | |
