= William Cary =

William Cary may refer to:

- William Cary (MP for Mitchell), represented Mitchell (UK Parliament constituency)
- William J. Cary (1865–1934), U.S. Representative from Wisconsin
- William L. Cary (1910–1983), Chairman of the U.S. Securities and Exchange Commission
- William Dennison Cary (1808–1861), founder and namesake of Cary, Illinois
- William Cary (instrument maker) (1759–1825), English maker of scientific instruments
- William Cary (1437–1471), gentry; beheaded after Battle of Tewkesbury
- W. Sterling Cary (1927–2021), American Christian minister

== See also ==
- William Carey (disambiguation)
