= L.A. Break Down (and Take Me In) =

1968 song written by Larry Marks

- German release cover

Single by Larry Marks
- B-side: "Country Woman"
- Released: August 1968
- Recorded: Mid 1968
- Genre: Folk-rock
- Length: 3:20
- Label: A&M; 969
- Songwriter: Larry Marks
- Producer: Larry Marks

Larry Marks singles chronology
"L.A. Break Down (and Take Me In)" (1968)	"Up On The High Side" (1969)

"L.A. Break Down (and Take Me In)"
- A-side of the US single

Single by Jack Jones

from the album L.A. Break Down
- B-side: "Love Story"
- Released: November 1968
- Recorded: Late 1968
- Genre: Vocal pop; Easy listening
- Length: 4:15
- Label: RCA Victor; 47-9687
- Songwriter: Larry Marks
- Producer: Ernie Altschuler

Jack Jones singles chronology
"People" (1968)	"L.A. Break Down (and Take Me In)" (1968)	"Far Away" (1968)

Professional ratings
Review scores
Source	Rating
Record World	4/5 stars
Cashbox	Positive (Best Bet)

"L.A. Break Down (and Take Me In)" is a folk-rock song written and first recorded by Larry Marks, who released it as his debut single in 1968. It saw another chart release by singer Jack Jones a few months later.

== Original by Larry Marks ==
=== Background and release ===
Larry Marks was a producer and composer. After signing A&M Records in August 1968, he started producing records for artists such as Liza Minnelli, Dillard and Clark and The Merry-Go-Round. His debut single came out at the same time.

Marks released the original version of the song in August 1968 on A&M Records. It was backed by another composition of his, "Country Woman" on the B-side. Both songs were produced by himself and "L.A. Break Down" was arranged by Ian Freebairn-Smith. With the moderately successful launch in the United States, the single was released in Germany in October 1968, receiving cover art as well.

=== Reception and chart performance ===
Billboard magazine predicted that it would reach the Top 60 on their Hot 100, writing "producer-composer-performer Marks comes on strong with a potent piece of folk-rock material with good lyric line and commercial driving arrangement." Concluding that "Could prove a left field smash."

Although not reaching the Top 60 as Billboard predicted, the record still reached the pop charts, although its presence on them varied. It debuted on the Billboard Bubbling Under Hot 100 in the issue dated October 5, 1968, at number 129. It dropped out the following week. It was ranked higher by Cashbox magazine, where it peaked at number 102 on their Looking Ahead chart. In Record World the single had broken into the 100 Top Pops chart, reaching number 83. With statistics compiled by Cashbox, "L.A. Break Down" had seen relatively high radio activity, with at one point 18% of stations adding the track to their prog. schedules.

== Jack Jones version ==
=== Background ===
By 1968 Jones' chart performance had waned, and the main chart he had success with was the Adult Contemporary chart. The new single followed a period of declining pop chart performance for Jones, but unlike most previous singles, completely missed the Cashbox charts. "L.A. Break Down (and Take Me In)" was the second-to-last of eight singles that he released that year. It was produced by Ernie Altschuler and arranged by Pam Williams, like on his previous singles. It was later featured on his 1969 album L.A. Break Down, which didn't chart. At this time Jones was fully recording for RCA Victor, with Kapp Records only reissuing his older material.

=== Release and reception ===
His ballad version of "L.A. Break Down (and Take Me In)" was released as a seven-inch single in November 1968 by RCA Victor Records in the United States. In the United Kingdom it was released on January 10, 1969. It was backed by a minor Peggy Lee hit song written by Randy Newman, titled "Love Story" on the B-side, which would be included on the same LP as "L.A. Break Down". Both songs featured Doug Talbert on the piano, and were unusually long for Jones' single releases at the time.

The single received a positive critical reception. Record World put the single in its "Four Stars" singles section, describing it as a "Moving story of a fellow with love problems." The magazine noted that it is "Smooth and very hip to what's happening". Cashbox magazine reviewed the single on November 30, 1968, writing that it is a "Softened ballad presentation of the recent Larry Marks song which has enough charm to win easy listening and middle-of-the-road exposure." Noting that "Could also spark interest in the A&M original." In the United Kingdom the single was received warmly as well. New Musical Express referred to the single as "terrific" whilst talking about Jones' trip to the country. Record Mirror's Peter Jones reviewed "Love Story", giving four stars and saying "Coming here soon is Jack Jones, who does a good but not outstanding job on this Randy Newman song," calling it "all a bit disjointed, served up this way".

=== Chart performance ===
The track debuted on the Billboard Bubbling Under Hot 100 on December 7, 1968, remaining on the chart for five weeks with a peak position of number 106. It became his last entry on the chart. "L.A. Break Down (and Take Me In)" was ranked higher on the Billboard Easy Listening survey, reaching number 21 during an eight-week run on it the next year. On the Record World Top-Non Rock survey the track rose to a higher position as well, quickly going to number 20 during a nine-week run on the chart.

=== Track listing ===
7" vinyl single

- "L.A. Break Down (and Take Me In)" - 4:15
- "Love Story" – 3:58

== Charts ==
Chart performance for "L.A. Break Down (and Take Me In)" by Larry Marks
Chart (1968)	Peak position
US Billboard Bubbling Under Hot 100	129
US Cashbox Looking Ahead	102
US Record World 100 Top Pops	83

Chart performance for "L.A. Break Down (and Take Me In)" by Jack Jones
Chart (1968–1969)	Peak position
US Billboard Bubbling Under Hot 100	106
US Billboard Easy Listening	21
US Record World Top Non-Rock	20
