= Ramsden Rock =

Rock in Antarctica

- Location of Livingston Island in the South Shetland Islands

- Location within Antarctica Location within South Shetland Islands

Geography
- Location: Antarctica
- Coordinates: 62°32′06.8″S 60°26′51″W
- Archipelago: South Shetland Islands
- Area: 0.47 ha (1.2 acres)
- Length: 127 m (417 ft)
- Width: 100 m (300 ft)

Administration
- Administered under the Antarctic Treaty

Demographics
- Population: uninhabited

Topographic map of Livingston Island and Smith Island

Ramsden Rock (Bulgarian: скала Рамсдън, romanized: skala Ramsden, IPA: [skɐˈla ˈramsdən]) is the rock off the north coast of Livingston Island in the South Shetland Islands, Antarctica 127 m long in southeast–northwest direction and 100 m wide. It is split in several abutting parts with an aggregate surface area of 0.47 ha. The vicinity was visited by early 19th century sealers.

The feature is named after Jesse Ramsden (1735-1800), a British mathematician and scientific instrument maker who created a modern, accurate surveyor's theodolite; in association with other names in the area deriving from the early development or use of geodetic instruments and methods.

== Location ==
Ramsden Rock is located in Hero Bay at 62°32′06.8″S 60°26′51″W, which is 1 km northwest of Siddins Point, 9 km east-northeast of Avitohol Point and 9 km southwest of Desolation Island, according to mapping done in 2009 and 2017.

== See also ==
- List of Antarctic and subantarctic islands

== Maps ==
- Livingston Island to King George Island. Scale 1:200000. Admiralty Nautical Chart 1776. Taunton: UK Hydrographic Office, 1968
- South Shetland Islands. Scale 1:200000 topographic map No. 3373. DOS 610 - W 62 58. Tolworth, UK, 1968
- L. Ivanov. Antarctica: Livingston Island and Greenwich, Robert, Snow and Smith Islands. Scale 1:120000 topographic map. Troyan: Manfred Wörner Foundation, 2010. ISBN 978-954-92032-9-5 (First edition 2009. ISBN 978-954-92032-6-4)
- L. Ivanov. Antarctica: Livingston Island and Smith Island. Scale 1:100000 topographic map. Manfred Wörner Foundation, 2017. ISBN 978-619-90008-3-0
- Antarctic Digital Database (ADD). Scale 1:250000 topographic map of Antarctica. Scientific Committee on Antarctic Research (SCAR). Since 1993, regularly upgraded and updated
