= Ramsden surveying instruments =

Instruments used in surveys 1784 to 1853

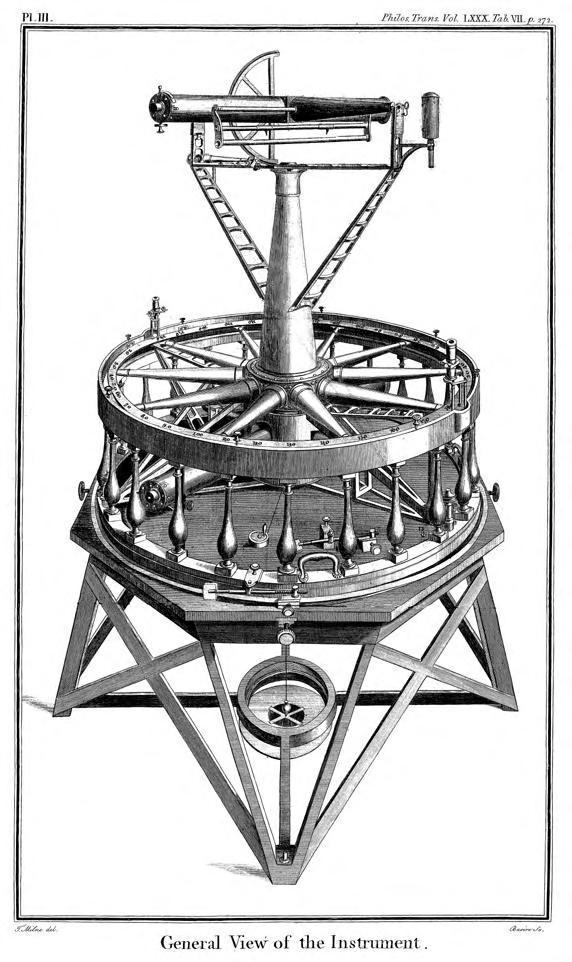
Ramsden RS, the theodolite of 1787. Destroyed by wartime bombing in Southampton in 1941.

The Ramsden surveying instruments are those constructed by Jesse Ramsden and used in high precision geodetic surveys carried out in the period 1784 to 1853. This includes the five great theodolites—great in name, great in size and great in accuracy—used in surveys of Britain and other parts of the world. Ramsden also provided the equipment used in the measurement of the many base lines of these surveys and also the zenith telescope used in latitude determinations.

== The great theodolites ==
A total of eight such instruments were manufactured by Ramsden and others for use in Britain, India and Switzerland. Ramsden himself constructed three theodolites and a further two were completed to his design by Mathew Berge, his son-in-law and business successor, after Ramsden's death in 1805. Of the other instruments one was constructed by William Cary and the other two by the firm of Troughton & Simms.

=== The Royal Society theodolite ===
In 1783 the Royal Society of London reacted to (unfounded) French criticism of Greenwich Observatory by seeking Royal assent to undertake a high precision geodetic survey, the Anglo-French Survey (1784–1790), between Greenwich and the established French survey stations on the other side of the English Channel. Approval having been granted, General William Roy agreed to undertake the work and he immediately approached Ramsden to commission new instruments. Three years later the "great" theodolite was delivered after a delay attributable to Ramsden's tardiness, workshop accidents and his predilection for continuous refinement—"this won't do, we must have at it again". The instrument was paid for by the Crown and the King immediately presented it to the Royal Society; for this reason the theodolite is designated as the Royal Society theodolite, or Ramsden RS in short.

There is a complete description of this theodolite in the final report of the Anglo-French Survey (1784–1790). The instrument was large, 36 inches (910 mm) across and it was normally mounted on a stand which placed the sighting telescope between 5 and 6 ft. high. It weighed about 200 pounds (91 kg) and the accessories and cases weighed as much again. It travelled around Britain for over sixty years, in its own sprung carriage, to locations where it was hauled up mountains, church towers and even scaffolded steeples.

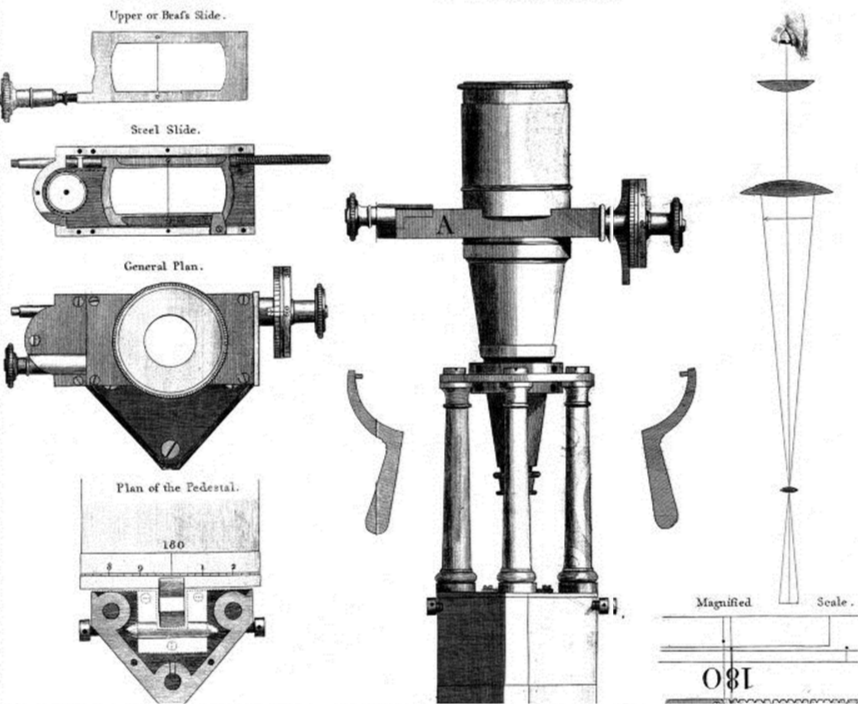
Detail of the micrometer microscopes.

The horizontal circular scale was divided very accurately with divisions at 15 minute (of arc) intervals using one of Ramden's own dividing engines; the marks on the 36-inch (910 mm) diameter scale would be about 1/6 inch (4.2 mm) apart. The position of the telescope could therefore be read to the nearest quarter of a degree by eye but the exact position between the divisions was read with the aid of micrometer microscopes fitted with adjustable cross wires in the focal plane, as shown. The threads of the screws were such that fifteen full turns moved from one scale mark to the next, i.e. 15 minutes, and since the scale on the adjusting knob allowed one sixtieth of a turn to be measured the resulting accuracy was within one arc second.

The instrument is also fitted with a vertical semi-circular scale to measure the elevations of distant stations and therefore a height difference. Cross wires similar to those used in the microscopes are fitted into the eyepiece; they are adjustable by a screw thread which allowed angles to be measured to within five arc seconds.

Typical distances in the Anglo-French Survey were less than 20 miles (32 km): at that distance one second of arc corresponds to lateral or vertical displacements at the target station of approximately 7 in (18 cm). No other theodolite could match this precision at that time. It was the first instrument to be able to measure the spherical excess of large survey triangles.

After completion of the Anglo-French Survey this instrument was stored at the Royal Society, but in 1799 the Board of Ordnance requested its use for the Principal Triangulation of Great Britain. On completion of the Survey the theodolite was stored in the headquarters of the Ordnance Survey at Southampton where it was destroyed in the bombing raids of 1941.

=== The Board of Ordnance theodolite ===
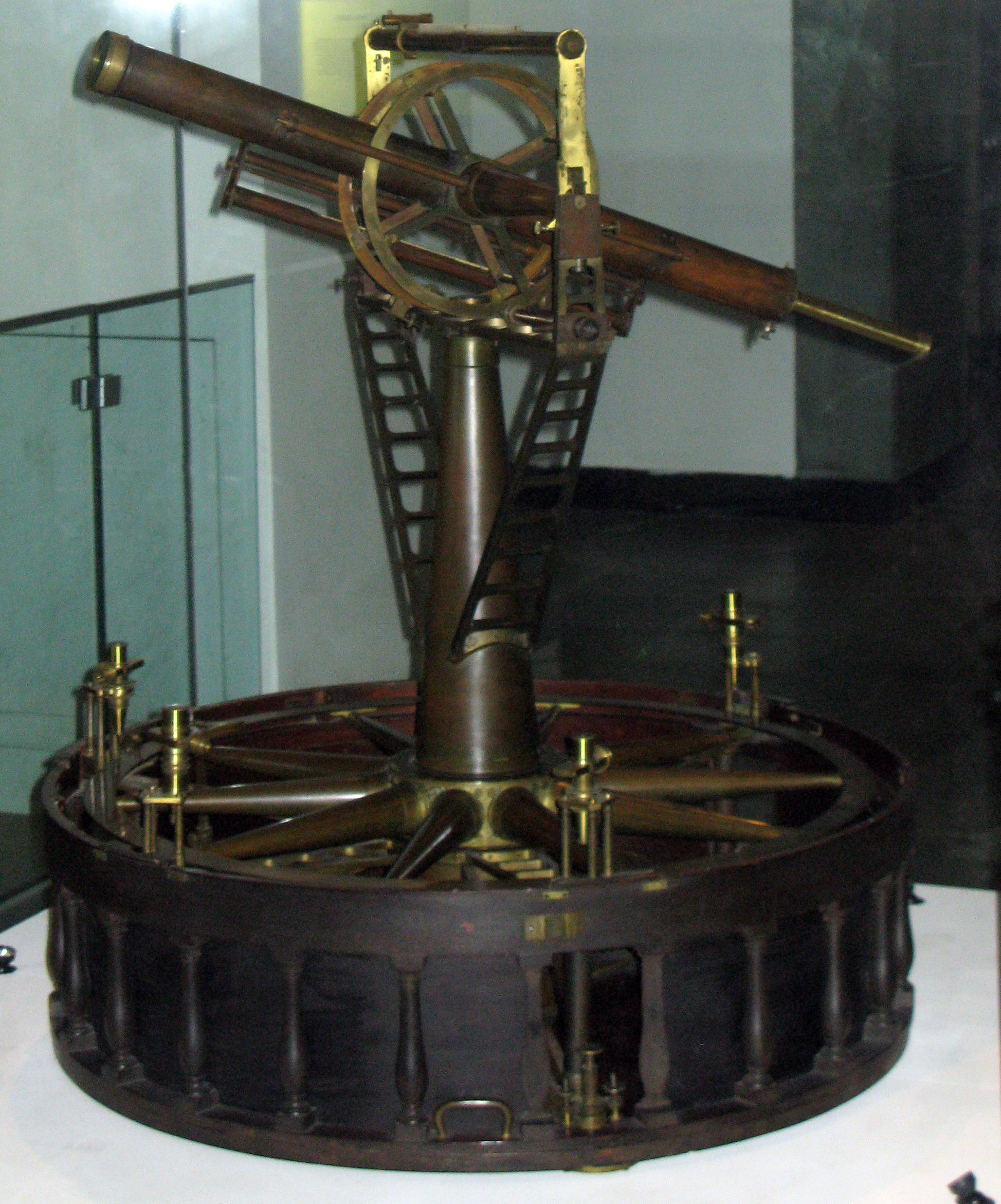
Ramsden BO, the theodolite of 1791. Now in the Science Museum, London

In his report to the Royal Society in 1775 William Roy had noted the suitability of India as a location for both meridian arc and parallel arc measurements. To his delight the East India Company were willing to undertake such a venture and ordered a second great theodolite from Ramsden. It was ready in 1791 but Ramsden felt obliged to increase the price because of problems in its manufacture. To his surprise the company rejected his price and refused to purchase the instrument. It was bought by the Duke of Richmond who, as Master of the Board of Ordnance, had provided most of the finance for Roy's Anglo-French Survey (1784–1790). The theodolite is designated as the Board of Ordnance theodolite, or Ramsden BO in short. Richmond's intention was to use the new theodolite on the extension of Roy's survey to the southern counties of Britain. The instrument was basically the same as the first with added refinements, mainly to the number and placement of the microscopes with their precision micrometer stages. It was in use until the completion of the Principal Triangulation of Great Britain in 1853 and it is now in the Science Museum in London.

There is a description of the improvements made to this theodolite in the account of the Trigonometrical Survey for the years 1791–1794 by Mudge, Williams and Dalby.

=== Other Ramsden theodolites ===
Ramsden made at least one other 3-foot (0.91 m) theodolite of which parts were discovered in Switzerland. After his death his firm was inherited by Mathew Berge who is known to have constructed two more large instruments to Ramsden's design. Ramsden made many theodolites including an eighteen-inch instrument of the same general design as the great theodolites. This instrument and his two great theodolites are described in the account of the Principal Triangulation by Clarke & James (1858).

=== Great theodolites by other builders ===
Although the East India Company turned down Ramsden's second theodolite, they commissioned a similar design from another London instrument maker, William Cary. This theodolite was in use in India from 1802 although there was a slight hiatus in 1808 when it was damaged when being hauled to the top of a building. It was repaired and in use for sixty years. A new theodolite to an improved design was made for the Indian Survey by Troughton and Simms in 1830 and the two together saw service until 1874 when the Cary instrument was replaced by another by Troughton and Sims. This last instrument was a monster weighing 1,455 lb (660 kg) when in its travelling cases: it was no surprise that it was deemed too heavy for transport up mountains and it passed to South Africa in 1882. No more great instruments were made after 1874 for continuing advances in precision instruments eclipsed their performance: by the end of the nineteenth century an accuracy of 1 arc second could be obtained with a 12-inch (300 mm) instrument.

== Chains and rods ==
Eighteenth-century surveyors used Gunter's chains which were 22 yards long (one chain with 100 links of 7.92 inches). Their accuracy was adequate for cadastral surveying but they were deemed insufficiently accurate for the Anglo-French Survey (1784–1790), Britain's first high-precision survey. Roy asked Ramsden to prepare a new chain of 100 links, each one foot in length. He also asked Ramsden to prepare three precisely-calibrated wooden rods 20 feet long. These proved to be a failure because of fluctuations in length due to varying humidity; instead three calibrated glass tubes were used. The chain proved to be as accurate as the glass tubes, and it was in use for baseline surveys over the next thirty years. Later, even more precise measurements showed that the accuracy of Ramsden's 100-foot (30 m) chain was within about 3 inches in 5 miles. In actual use the chain was supported throughout its length by wooden trestles, and tensioned with a known constant weight. Its coefficient of thermal expansion was carefully measured so that temperature fluctuations could be taken into account. Full details (with plates) are given in Roy's account of the measurement of the Hounslow Heath baseline.

American surveyors sometimes also used a chain of 100 feet, also with 100 links, known as the engineer's chain. The term chain in both cases usually refers to the measuring instrument rather than a unit of length, and distances measured are normally given in feet and decimal fractions of a foot (not inches).

Despite Ramsden's chain originating in the UK, Gunter's predominated there: "When a chain is spoken of without qualification, Gunter's chain is meant", noted Macquorn Rankine's mid-Victorian A Manual of Civil Engineering.

== The zenith telescope ==
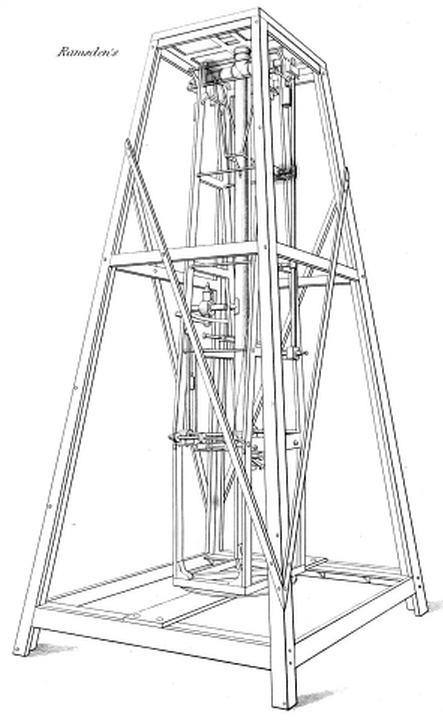
Ramsden's zenith telescope.

The zenith telescope constructed by Jesse Ramsden in 1802 was used to determine the latitude of many stations of the Principal Triangulation of Great Britain. This portable instrument was designed to bring observatory precision to fieldwork. The outer frame stood about 12 ft (3.7 m) tall and the telescope mounted on an inner frame was 8 ft (2.4 m) long. The telescope was restricted to observations within a few degrees of the zenith in order to prevent errors due to refraction. A complete description of the instrument is given by Pearson.

== See also ==
- Repeating circle

== Bibliography ==
- Clarke, Alexander Ross; James, Henry (1858). Account of the observations and calculations of the Principal Triangulation; and of the figure, dimensions and mean specific gravity of the Earth as derived therefrom. London: G.E. Eyre and W. Spottiswoode. OCLC 757179661. PLATES. An excellent summary of the report was published in the Monthly Notices of the Royal Astronomical Society.
- Insley, Jane (2008). The Tale of the Great Theodolites (PDF). FIG Working Week on Integrating the Generations. Sweden.
- Maskelyne, Nevil (1785). "Concerning the Latitude and Longitude of the Royal Observatory at Greenwich; With Remarks on a Memorial of the Late M. Cassini de Thury". Philosophical Transactions of the Royal Society of London. 75: 385–480. doi:10.1098/rstl.1787.0018. S2CID 186209872.
- McConnell, Anita (2007). Jesse Ramsden (1735–1800): London's leading scientific instrument maker. Aldershot: Ashgate Publishing Limited. ISBN 978-0-7546-6136-8. There is a substantial review by Richard Dunn.
- Mudge, William; Dalby, Isaac; Williams, Edward (1795). "An Account of the Trigonometrical Survey Carried on in the Years 1791, 1792, 1793, and 1794". Philosophical Transactions of the Royal Society. 84: 414–622. doi:10.1098/rstl.1795.0023.
- Owen, Tim; Pilbeam, Elaine (1992). Ordnance Survey, map makers to Britain since 1791. Southampton: Ordnance Survey (HMSO). ISBN 9780319002490. OCLC 28220563. Freely available online at the Ordnance Survew, Owen and Pilbeam
- Pearson, William (1829). An Introduction to Practical Astronomy: Volume 2. Cambridge University Press. pp. 534–554. ISBN 9781108064064.
- "Ramsden the optician". The Mirror of Literature, Amusement and Instruction. 10: 80. 1827.
- Ramsden, Jesse (1877). Description of an engine for dividing mathematical instruments. London: The Commissioners of Longitude. (The plates are incomplete.)
- Roy, William (1785). "An Account of the Measurement of a Base on Hounslow-Heath". Philosophical Transactions of the Royal Society of London. 75: 385–480. doi:10.1098/rstl.1785.0024.
- Roy, William (1790). "An Account of the Trigonometrical Operation, Whereby the Distance between the Meridians of the Royal Observatories of Greenwich and Paris Has Been Determined". Philosophical Transactions of the Royal Society of London. 80: 111–254. doi:10.1098/rstl.1790.0015. S2CID 186211548.
- Turner, Gerard L'Estrange (1983). Nineteenth-century Scientific Instruments. University of California Press. ISBN 0520051602. Chapter 14, page 146, covers surveying instruments,
