= William Roy =

Scottish military engineer, surveyor and antiquarian (1726–1790)

Major-General William Roy FRS FSA FRSE
- Born: 4 May 1726; Carluke, Scotland
- Died: 1 July 1790 (aged 64); London, England
- Military career
- Known for: The Military Survey of Scotland. The survey linking Britain and France. The foundations of the Ordnance Survey.
- Awards: Copley Medal (1785)

Major-General William Roy (4 May 1726 – 1 July 1790) was a Scottish military engineer, surveyor, and antiquarian. He was an innovator who applied new scientific discoveries and newly emerging technologies to the accurate geodetic mapping of Great Britain. His masterpiece is usually referred to as Roy's Map of Scotland.

It was Roy's advocacy and leadership that led to the creation of the Ordnance Survey in 1791, the year after his death. His technical work in the establishment of a surveying baseline won him the Copley Medal in 1785. His maps and drawings of Roman archaeological sites in Scotland were the first accurate and systematic study of the subject, and have not been improved upon even today. Roy was a Fellow of the Royal Society and of the Society of Antiquaries of London.

== Life and works ==
=== Early life and family ===
Roy was born at Miltonhead in Carluke parish in South Lanarkshire on 4 May 1726. His father was a factor in the service of the Gordons/Hamiltons of Hallcraig, as well as an elder of the Kirk. His grandfather had held a similar position as factor, and his uncle acted in that capacity for the Lockharts of Lee. Thus Roy grew up in an environment where making land surveys and using maps was very familiar. He was educated in Carluke parish school and then Lanark Grammar School. There is no record of a further education such as that enjoyed by his younger brother James.

The next few years of his life are poorly documented and have been the subject of much speculation. Roy was certainly associated with the Board of Ordnance by about 1747 (aged 21) when he drew a map of Culloden made some time after the battle.

He had come to the notice of Lieutenant-Colonel David Watson, Deputy Quartermaster-General of the Military District of North Britain for the board, whose headquarters were in Edinburgh. At an unknown date Roy had had some opportunity to gain experience by undertaking private surveys for he was a respected land surveyor employed by the Callander family at their Craigforth estate near Stirling sometime before he joined the army in 1755.

Roy maintained his connections to his birthplace and the people living there. A servant for the Lockharts of Lee recalled his visits there over time, as his national reputation grew. She noted that at first he would dine in the servants hall, in later years he would dine with the family, and later still he would be seated at the right hand of the Laird.

=== Monument ===
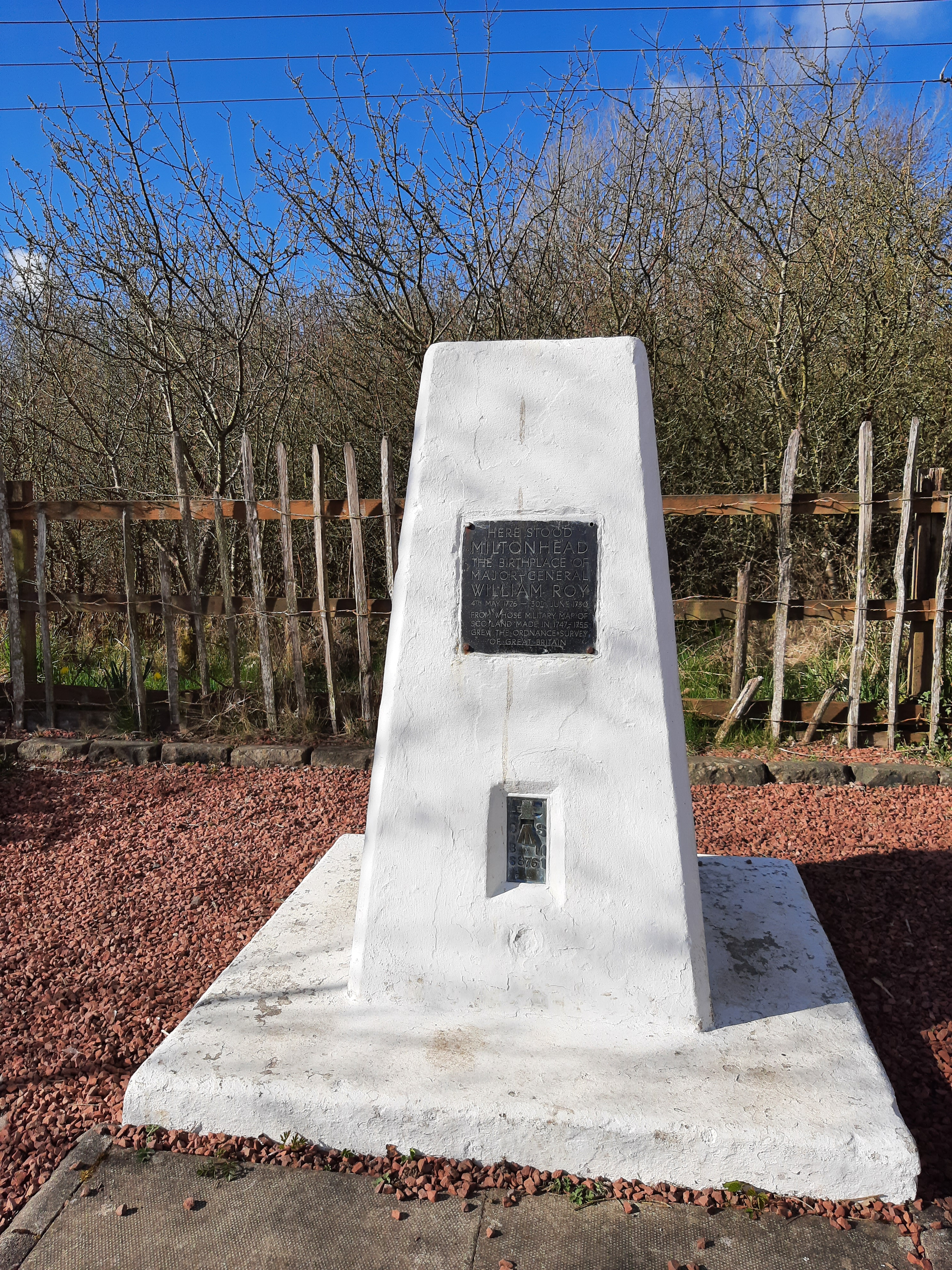
William Roy monument, Carluke

There is a monument to William Roy at the location of his birthplace on Milton Road near Carluke. It is signposted from the junction of Lanark Road and Cartland Avenue. The monument is in the form of a Hotine pillar, a type of trig point. The inscription reads "Here stood Miltonhead the birthplace of Major-General William Roy 4th May 1726 - 30th June 1790 from whose military map of Scotland made in 1747 - 1755 grew the Ordnance Survey of Great Britain".

=== Principal sources ===
- Baigent (2004a) Dictionary of National Biography (online).
- Welfare (2024) General William Roy: Father of the Ordnance Survey. The first full biography (pbk edn).
- Roy (2007) The Great Map: The Military Survey of Scotland.
- Close (1969) The Early Years of the Ordnance Survey. First published in 1924. Includes some of Roy's letters.
- Hewitt (2011) Map of a Nation: a Biography of the Ordnance Survey.
- Owen & Pilbeam (1992) Ordnance Survey, map makers to Britain since 1791. Available online.
- Seymour (1980) A History of the Ordnance Survey. The official account. References to original papers. Available online.
- Porter (1889) History of the Corps of Royal Engineers. Available online.

== Roy as surveyor and soldier ==
=== The survey of Scotland ===
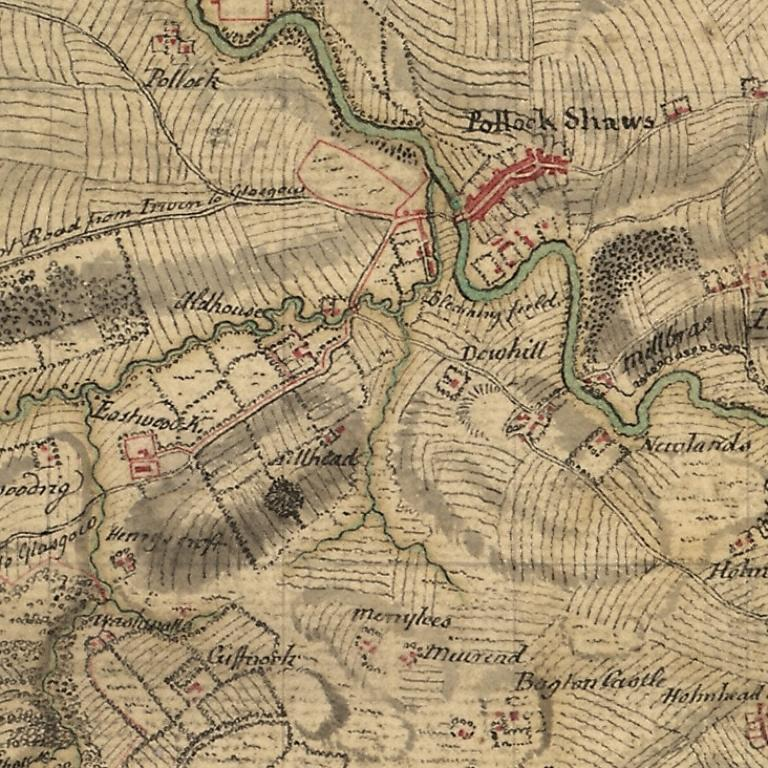
Detail (Pollokshaws, now in Glasgow) from a map in Roy's Military Survey of Scotland.

In 1747 Lieutenant-Colonel David Watson, Deputy Quartermaster-General, proposed the compilation of a map of the Scottish Highlands following the Jacobite rising of 1745. In response, King George II commissioned a military survey of the Highlands, and Watson was placed in charge, under the command of the Duke of Cumberland, but it fell to Roy "to begin, and afterwards to have a considerable share in, the execution of that map".

Roy was without any military rank at this time but Watson appointed him as an Assistant Quartermaster to provide him some seniority over the group of (typically) six soldiers who travelled with him: an NCO, two end markers, two chainmen and a batman. From 1749 he was joined by six more junior surveyors for various periods of time, including a seventeen-year-old David Dundas (born 1735), later Commander-in-Chief of the armed forces. Paul Sandby (born 1731), later renowned for his watercolour landscapes, was responsible for preparing the fair copy of the map.

Eventually there were six teams conducting surveys by traverses of the country: objects on either side of the line were recorded by sketches and compass directions. The Highlands were covered by 1752, but the survey was extended to the lowlands for another three years, until 1755, when most of the engineer surveyors were posted to war stations. In the introduction to the 1785 account of the measurement of the Hounslow baseline Roy writes that the map remained "in an unfinished state ... and is to be considered as a magnificent military sketch rather than a very accurate map of a country ... (and) it would have been completed, and many of its imperfections no doubt remedied, but for the breaking out of war in 1755." The eighty-four original field sheets and the thirty-eight divisions of the "fair-protraction" are held in the British Museum together with a small index map and a reduced map of the whole country in a single sheet published as "the King's map". It is now possible to view the map online.

=== Military appointments ===
Throughout the Survey of Scotland, Roy was a civilian assistant to David Watson the Deputy Quartermaster-General, but in 1755 the survey was terminated by the outbreak of the Seven Years' War with France and the consequent redeployment of personnel to more pressing posts in both the regular army and the Board of Ordnance. In the1757 the Engineers were formed into the Corps of Engineers. The officers of the Board of Ordnance were members of both structures, for they would be deployed with the army regiments for specialist duties.

In 1755-6 Roy was commissioned as a lieutenant in the 53rd Foot, a new regiment, and as a Practitioner Engineer, the lowest rank in the Board of Ordnance survey department. Thereafter Roy was promoted steadily, and rapidly, in both structures, but his army rank was always greater than his board rank. For example, he was lieutenant-colonel in the army by 1762 and director and lieutenant-colonel of the Engineers in 1783. He is best known by his army rank of major-general, which he attained in 1781.

From 1786 to his death in 1790, Roy held the position of Colonel of the 30th (Cambridgeshire) Regiment of Foot.

=== Active service ===
On the termination of the Scottish survey, Roy, now under the jurisdiction of two military bodies, was posted in 1756 to the South of England where he was engaged, together with Watson and Dundas, in inspecting the readiness of coastal military installations in preparation for an expected French invasion. This work involved Roy in the production of plans of fortifications and maps of roads of strategic importance and of stretches of the south coast: examples are a sketch of the country from Gloucester to Pembroke, with Milford Haven, and a sketch of the country between Guildford and Canterbury. These sketches are preserved in the British Library.

By 1757 Roy was with his regiment in France for the Rochefort expedition and then for the raid on St Malo. In 1759-63 he was with the army in Germany. At the Battle of Minden in 1759 his technical abilities and willingness to innovate brought him to the favourable attention of his commanders. Lieutenant Roy presented his survey of the battle on a sheet with coordinated and accurate overlying flaps that showed the different stages in the engagement. Thereafter his promotion was rapid, and by the end of the war in 1763 Roy was a Lieutenant Colonel in the regiment and the Deputy Quartermaster General responsible for the evacuation of the army from Germany.

=== Surveyor and man of science ===
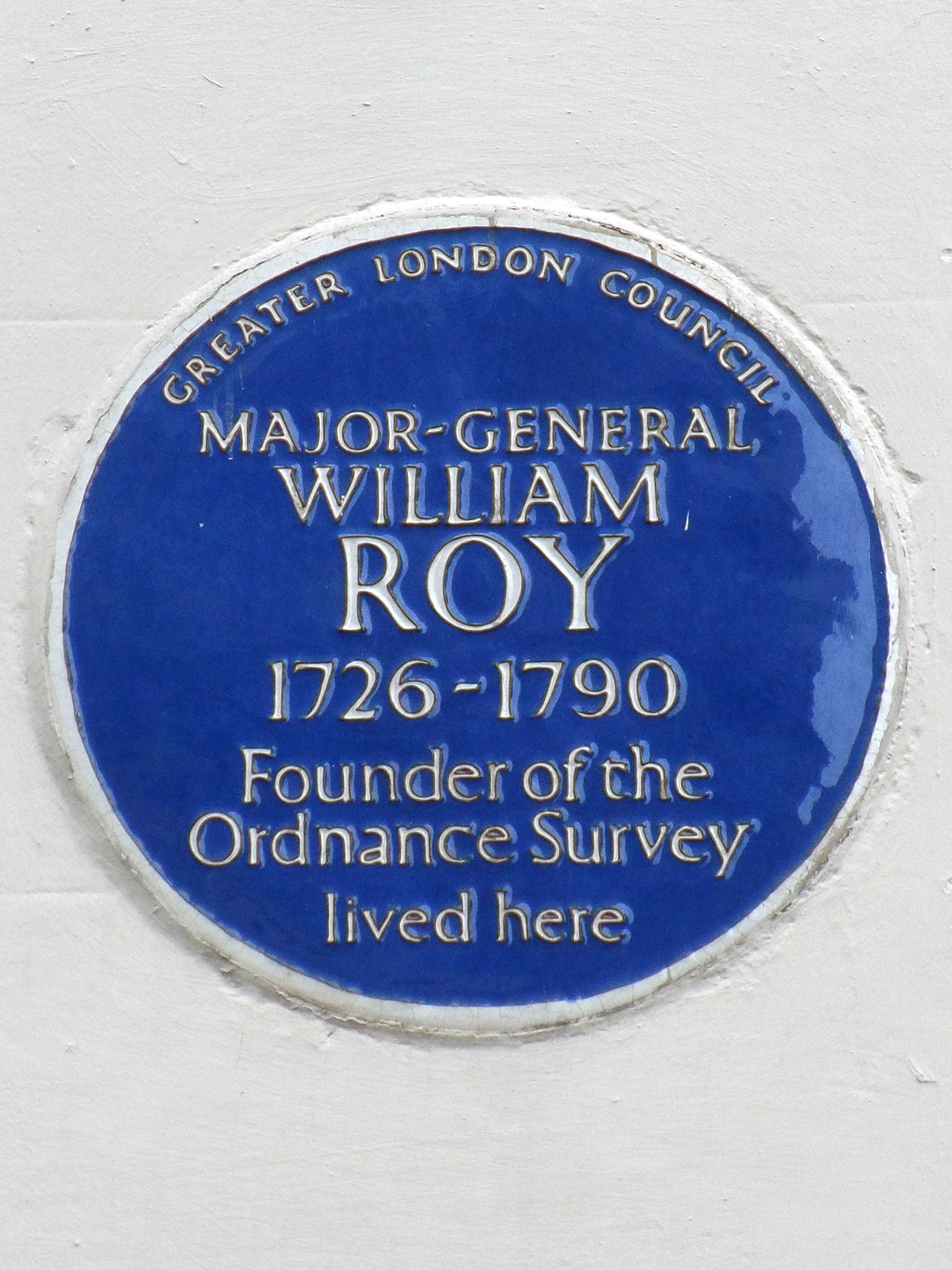
Blue plaque at Roy's London home, 10 Argyll Street.

At the conclusion of the war in 1763 Roy returned to London, where he was based for the rest of his life. The threatened French invasion of the south coast had never materialised, but he felt strongly that the reconnaissances he had made with Watson at the outbreak of the war should be extended to a national survey, not just of the vulnerable south but the whole of the British Isles. He never ceased to champion this cause, but the expense of the Seven Years' War and then the American War of Independence excluded any expenditure on trigonometrical surveys for another twenty years.

During the Military Survey of Scotland he had recorded the whole coastline, a topic which became an acknowledged speciality. In 1765 he was appointed under a Royal Warrant "to inspect, survey and make reports from time to time of the state of the coasts of this Kingdom and the islands thereunto belonging." This work - crucial to the defence of the realm - took him to many parts of Britain and Ireland and is recorded in the many plans and sketch maps of districts that are now lodged at the British Library.

Despite the necessary time away from the capital, Roy was able to enter fully into the intellectual life of London, and in 1767 he became a Fellow of the Royal Society; the Society's dining clubs were his social centre. The first paper that he published in the Society's Philosophical Transactions, in 1777, was on the search for a rule to determine topographical heights using barometric pressure, a subject on which he had conducted exhaustive and meticulous research and fieldwork. Roy was promoted to Colonel in 1777, as Commissary General in 1778 and to rose to Major General in 1781.

=== The Anglo-French survey ===
Late in life, when he was 57, Roy was granted the opportunity to establish his lasting reputation in the world of geodesy. The opening came from a completely unexpected direction. In 1783 he measured a baseline at Jews Harp, in St Pancras on the edge of London. This may have stimulated Cassini de Thury to address a memoir to the Royal Society in which he expressed grave reservations about the measurements of latitude and longitude which had been undertaken at Greenwich Observatory. He suggested that the correct values might be found by combining the Paris Observatory figures with a precise triangulation (survey) between the two observatories. Sir Joseph Banks, president of the Royal Society, proposed that Roy should lead the project. Roy accepted with enthusiasm for he relished the technical challenge and saw that this could be the first step towards the national survey that he had advocated so often. The whole project is described by Roy in three major contributions to the Philosophical Transactions of the Royal Society in 1785, 1787 and 1790. There are shorter accounts of the project in the History of the Royal Engineers, the records of the Royal Society and in every history of the Ordnance Survey.

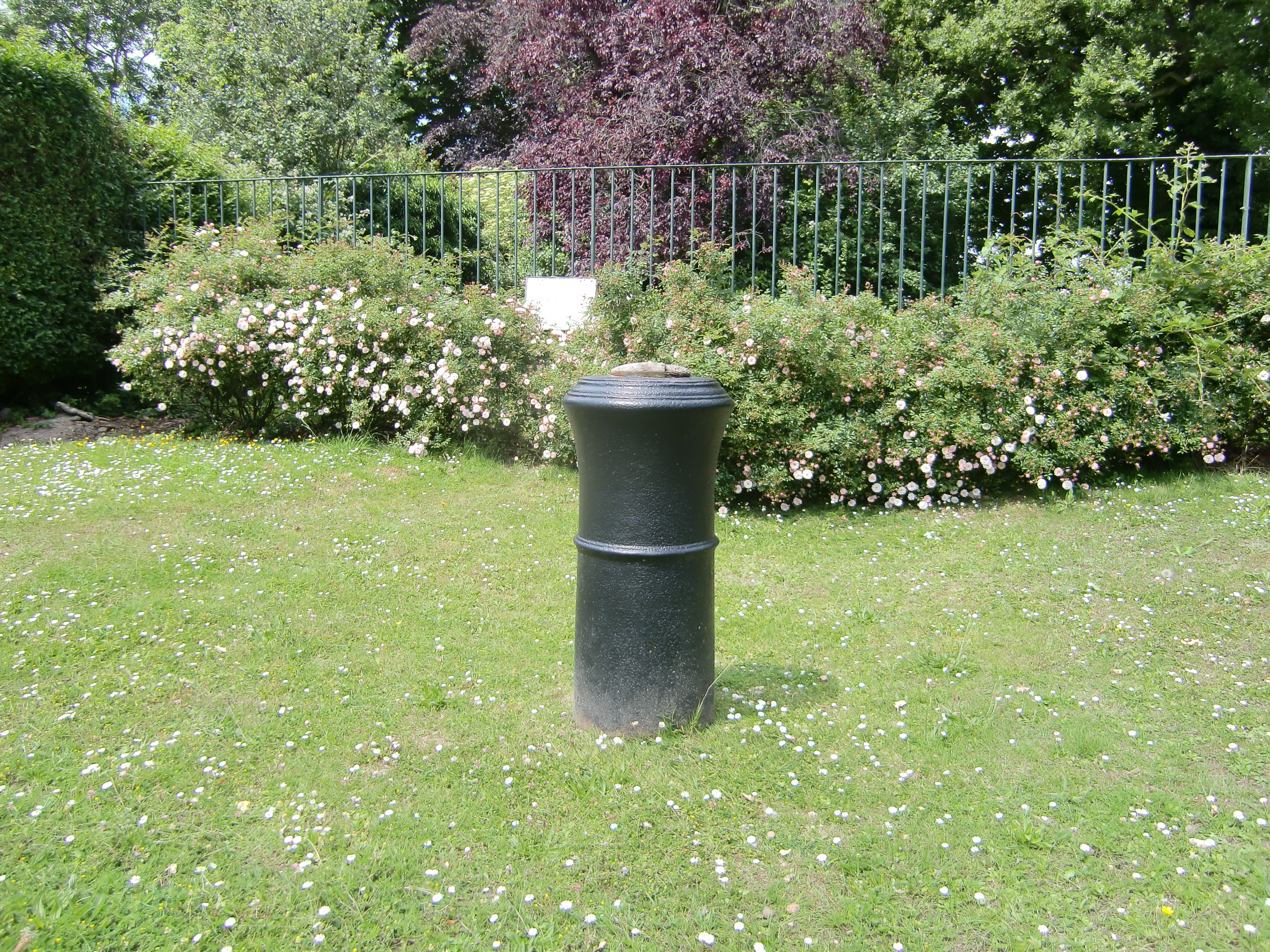
Cannon in Roy Grove, Hampton marking the Hampton end of the first baseline of the triangulation of Great Britain

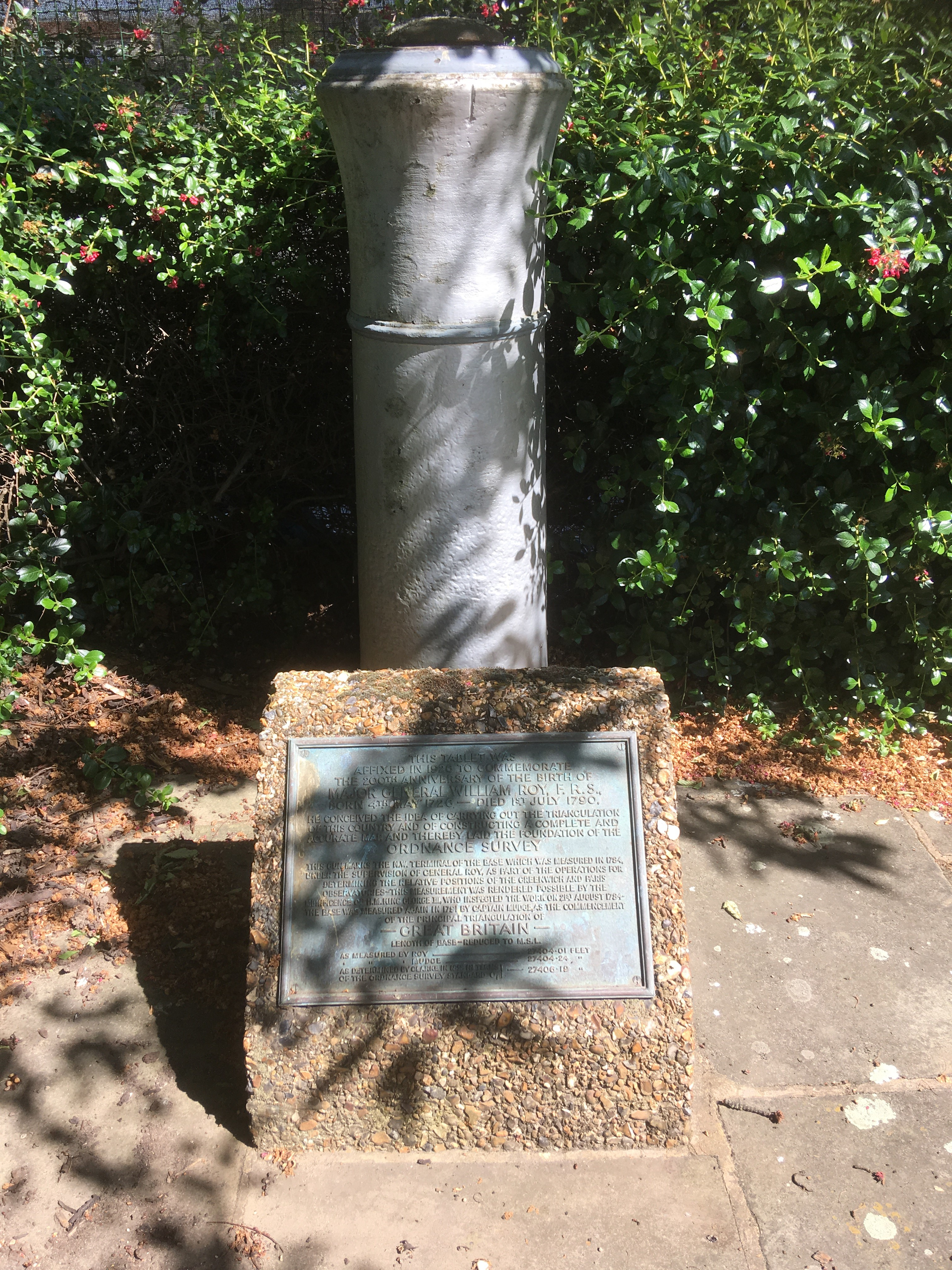
Cannon near Heathrow Airport Northern Perimeter Road, marking the northern end of the baseline

After a preliminary survey by Roy and three other members of the Society on 16 April, they fixed on a suitable location for the baseline on Hounslow Heath, between King's Arbour and Hampton Poor-house, just over 5 miles to the south-east. An initial measurement of the line was carried out with a steel chain prepared by Jesse Ramsden. It was the intention to measure more accurately with a set of three deal rods about 20 ft. in length but their use had to be abandoned because of their susceptibility to lengthen or shorten, depending on the weather. The deal rods were replaced by one-inch-thick glass tubes of the same length. The final measurement gave the length of the base as 27404.7 ft. to an accuracy of about 3 inches in 5 miles (or about 1/100,000). The precision of this baseline measurement far exceeded any previous attempts and, in recognition of this, Roy was awarded the Copley Medal by the Royal Society in 1785.

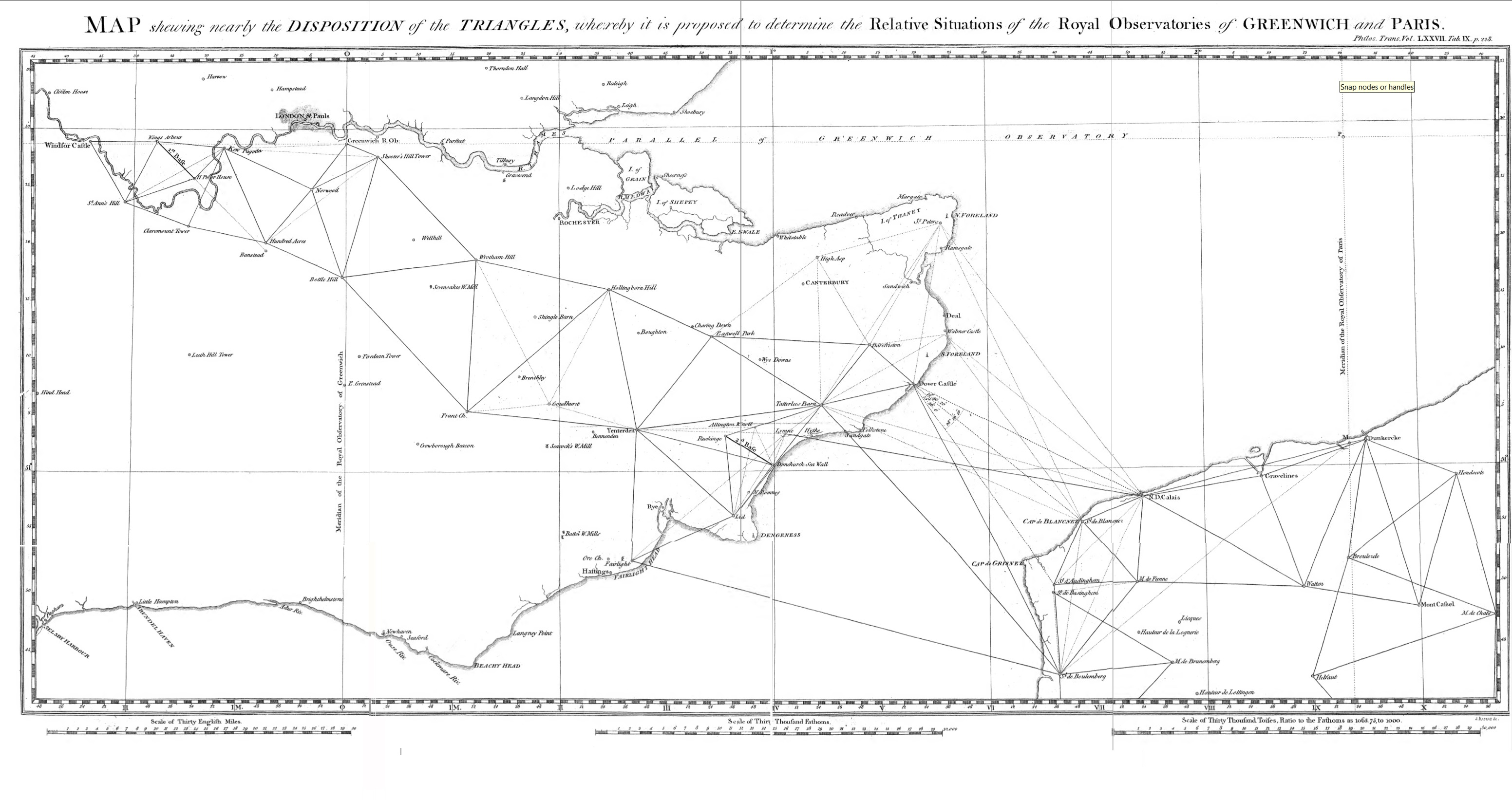
The proposed triangulation mesh of the Anglo-French survey 1784–1790. For the actual mesh used see File:Anglo-French survey of 1784-1790.jpg

The triangulation itself was delayed until 1787 when Ramsden supplied a new theodolite of unsurpassed accuracy: it could measure angles to within one arc second and therefore detect the curvature of the Earth by measuring the spherical excess of the triangles of the survey. By the end of that year Roy had completed measurements at all but two of the trigonometric stations. Many of the measurements, particularly the cross channel sightings, were taken at night using intense flares (handled by the artillery). Others required the placing of the instrument on church towers, or even on scaffolded steeples, and in their absence it was sometimes necessary to use a specially constructed portable tower some 30 feet high.

The final report of 1790 presents figures for the distance between Paris and Greenwich as well as the precise latitude, longitude and height of the British triangulation stations. Throughout the survey Roy took every opportunity to fix the position of as many landmarks as possible and these formed the basis of the topographic surveys from which new maps could be prepared. Roy died when only three pages of his final report remained to be proofed.

=== Roy's scientific legacy ===
Roy's use of scientific advancements and accurate mathematical formulae paved the way for modern geodesic surveying. His work proved to be the dividing line in Britain between the older, approximate cartography and newer, highly accurate methods. He is cited repeatedly in early nineteenth-century mathematics textbooks for his use of spherical trigonometry in surveying. Early twentieth-century books on surveying and geodesy include Roy's work as the historical starting point for the modern profession. His greatest legacy was in establishing the principles and standards that would underpin the work of the Ordnance Survey which began in 1791, one year after his death. It extended the basic Anglo-French Survey (1784–1790) to the rest of Great Britain over the following sixty years.

== Roy as antiquary ==
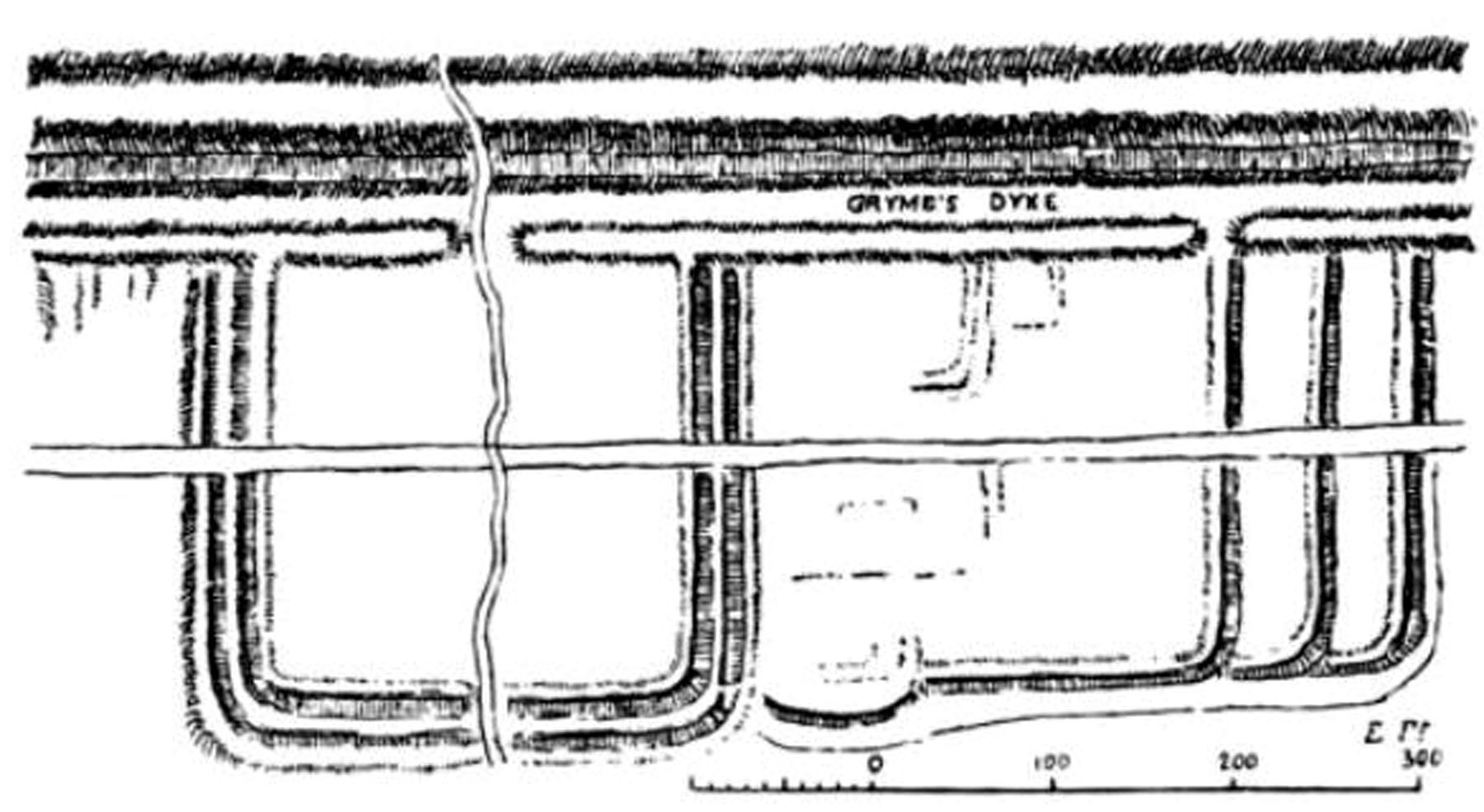
Rough Castle, on the Antonine Wall, drawn by William Roy in 1755.

During the Military Survey of Scotland, Roy had taken careful note of the locations of ancient Roman remains, primarily military camps, wherever they were encountered, and these were all marked precisely on the map sheets. Fired by the work of Robert Melville, in Strathmore, this was the beginning of a lifelong interest in tactical military landscapes which he pursued wherever he was in the country. Roy's deatiled surveys of the Roman camps and forts in Scotland broke new ground because the sites were depicted in the form in which they had survived, rather than as reconstructions of what they were thought to have been. For sites that were later destroyed by development, his drawings are the only reliable record.Roy was the first to systematically map the Antonine Wall and to provide accurate and detailed drawings of its remains, work that he undertook in 1755.

Roy's only antiquarian work, Military Antiquities of the Romans in Britain, was published posthumously in 1793. This book has a mixed reputation. His drawings and maps are held in the highest regard as still-valuable research sources. However, his discussion of the geography of Roman Scotland is largely without value, through no fault of his own. This was due to his belief that the spurious text of Charles Bertram De Situ Britanniae was a genuine work, a view shared by virtually all of his contemporaries. Roy consequently adjusted his perspectives to be consistent with Bertram's plausible hoax, fatally undermining his own conclusions.

That Roy's considerable talents were partly wasted in this way is a tragedy. His technical ability, scientific knowledge, and practical military experience made him uniquely qualified to understand the remains of the Roman occupation of Scotland. O.G.S. Crawford, the first Archaeology Officer of the Ordnance Survey, considered that Melville and Roy came "into the stuffy room of eighteenth-century antiquarianism like a breath of clean, fresh air. They tower over their contemporaries and many of their successors." "Modern field archaeology began with General Roy ..."

== Bibliography and general references ==
=== Roy's major scientific papers ===
- Roy, William (1777). "Experiments and Observations Made in Britain, in Order to Obtain a Rule for Measuring Heights with the Barometer". Philosophical Transactions of the Royal Society of London. 67: 653–787. doi:10.1098/rstl.1777.0035. S2CID 186209787.
- Roy, William (1785). "An Account of the Measurement of a Base on Hounslow-Heath". Philosophical Transactions of the Royal Society of London. 75: 385–480. doi:10.1098/rstl.1785.0024.
- Roy, William (1787). "An Account of the Mode Proposed to be Followed in Determining the Relative Situation of the Royal Observatories of Greenwich and Paris". Philosophical Transactions of the Royal Society of London. 77: 188–226. doi:10.1098/rstl.1787.0019. S2CID 186214773. Plates follow text
- Roy, William (1790). "An Account of the Trigonometrical Operation, Whereby the Distance between the Meridians of the Royal Observatories of Greenwich and Paris Has Been Determined". Philosophical Transactions of the Royal Society of London. 80: 111–254. doi:10.1098/rstl.1790.0015. S2CID 186211548.

=== Roy's historical publication ===
- Roy, William (1793), Military Antiquities of the Romans in North Britain, London: The Society of Antiquities of London, archived from the original on 26 April 2009

=== Roy's maps and plans (partial list) ===
The British Library holds a large collection of Roy's works (at Maps K.Top.48.25-1.a-f.); plans of Roman camps, plans of fortifications and maps of surveys conducted by himself are others. All of these works show Roy to have been an exceptionally neat and capable draughtsman. The principal items include

- Military Survey of Scotland, 1747–1755,
- The Duke of Cumberland's Map (1747),
- A General Description of the South Part of Ireland, or Observations during a Short Tour in Ireland (1766),
- Roman Post at Ardoch, Roman Camp, Dalginross, Genearn, Roman Temple at Netherby, Cumberland, Stratgeth Roman Post, near Innerpeffrey, Strathearn,
- Culloden House, Esk River, Kent, New Romney to North Foreland, Louisbourg, Milford Haven, Coast of Sussex, Southeast part of England, Country between Guildford and Canterbury, Hindhead to Cocking, Lewes Road from Croydon to Chailey, Country from Dorchester to Salisbury, Country from Gloucester to Pembroke, Marden Castle, near Dorchester.

=== Histories of the Ordnance Survey ===
- Close, Charles (1969). The Early Years of the Ordnance Survey. David and Charles. ISBN 978-0715344774. OCLC 752917465. This is a reprint (with a new introduction by J.B. Harley) of a book published in 1924. The author changed his name to Arden-Close at a later date.
- Hewitt, Rachel (2011). Map of a Nation: a biography of the Ordnance Survey. Granta Books. ISBN 978-1-84708-254-1.
- Owen, Tim; Pilbeam, Elaine (1992). Ordnance Survey, map makers to Britain since 1791. Southampton: Ordnance Survey (HMSO). ISBN 9780319002490. OCLC 28220563. Freely available online at ordnancesurvey.co.uk
- Seymour, W. A., ed. (1980). A History of the Ordnance Survey. Folkestone, England: Dawson. ISBN 978-0-7129-0979-2. OCLC 654935343. Freely available online at ordnancesurvey.co.uk

=== General references ===
- Anderson, Carolyn J. (2010). Constructing the military landscape: the Board of Ordnance maps and plans of Scotland, 1689–1815. Edinburgh Research Archive. hdl:1842/4598.
- Burke, Edmund, ed. (1793), The Annual Register For the Year 1790, London: J. Dodsley, p. 212
- Campbell, James (1832), Memoirs of Sir James Campbell of Ardkinglas, vol. I, London: Henry Colburn and Richard Bentley, pp. 32–34
- Hutton, Charles (1831), Gregory, Olinthus; Adrain, Robert (eds.), A Course of Mathematics, vol. II (5th American ed.), New York: T. and J. Swords, pp. 26–98
- Hübner, Emil (1886), "The Roman Annexation of Britain", in Hodgkin, Thomas (ed.), Archaeologia Aeliana, New, vol. XI, Newcastle upon Tyne: Society of Antiquaries of Newcastle upon Tyne, pp. 82–116
- Irving, Joseph (1885), The West of Scotland in History, Glasgow: Robert Forster, pp. 242–50
- Martin, Jean-Pierre; McConnell, Anita (2008). "Joining the observatories of Paris and Greenwich". Notes and Records of the Royal Society. 62 (4): 355–372. doi:10.1098/rsnr.2008.0029. S2CID 143514819.
- Maskelyne, Nevil (1787), "Concerning the Latitude and Longitude of the Royal Observatory at Greenwich; With Remarks on a Memorial of the Late M. Cassini de Thury", Philosophical Transactions of the Royal Society of London, 75: 385–480, doi:10.1098/rstl.1787.0018, S2CID 186209872
- O'Donoghue, Yolande (1977), William Roy 1726–1790. Pioneer Of The Ordnance Survey, British Museum Publications, ISBN 978-0-7141-0387-7
- Popplewell, William Charles (1915), The Elements of Surveying and Geodesy, Longmans, Green and Co: Longmans, Green and co., pp. 163–76
- Porter, Whitworth (1889), History of the Corps of Royal Engineers, vol. 1, London: Longmans, Green, and Co
- Porter, Whitworth (1889), History of the Corps of Royal Engineers, vol. 2, London: Longmans, Green, and Co
- Rankin, William (1874), Notices, Historical, Statistical and Biographical, Relating to the Parish of Carluke from 1288 till 1874, Glasgow: W. Rankin, pp. 289–94. This short chapter is entitled "Major-Gen Wm. Roy, F.R.S, A.S"
- Skene, William Forbes (1886), Celtic Scotland: A History of Ancient Alban (History and Ethnology), vol. I (2nd ed.), Edinburgh: David Douglas, pp. 22–23, ISBN 9780836949766
- Stephens, Henry Morse (1888), "Dundas, David (1735–1820" , in Stephen, Leslie (ed.), Dictionary of National Biography, vol. 16, London: Smith, Elder & Co, pp. 183–185)
- H.M.C. (1883), "Maj.-Gen. William Roy, F.R.S. Colonel 30 foot", The Army and Navy Magazine, vol. VI, London: W. H. Allen & Co, pp. 160–69
- Vetch, Robert Hamilton (1897), "Roy, William (1726–1790)" , in Lee, Sidney (ed.), Dictionary of National Biography, vol. 49, London: Smith, Elder & Co, pp. 371–373
- Vetch, Robert Hamilton (1899), "Watson, David (1713?-1761)" , in Lee, Sidney (ed.), Dictionary of National Biography, vol. 60, London: Smith, Elder & Co, pp. 4–5

Military offices
Preceded by John Parslow	Colonel of the 30th (Cambridgeshire) Regiment of Foot; 1786–1790	Succeeded by Sir Henry Calder
