= William Carey =

William or Bill Carey may refer to:

- William Carey (courtier) (c. 1500–1528), courtier of King Henry VIII of England
- William Carey (missionary) (1761–1834), English Baptist missionary, philologist, orientalist, translator
  - William Carey University, established in 1892 in Mississippi
- William Carey (MP) (died 1593), MP for Morpeth and Northumberland
- William Carey (bishop) (1769–1846), English churchman and headmaster, bishop of Exeter and of St Asaph
- William Carey (politician) (1887–1928), Australian politician
- William P. Carey (1930–2012), American businessman
- William D. Carey (1912–1998), publisher of Science, 1975–1987
- William Carey (bailiff) (1853–1915), Bailiff of Guernsey
- William Paulet Carey (1759–1839), Irish art critic and publicist
- William R. Carey (1806–1836), volunteer soldier during the Texas Revolution
- Bill Carey (songwriter) (1916–2004), American songwriter
- Bill Carey (fl. 1970s–2000s), member of the comedy musical group Ogden Edsl
- Bill Carey (footballer) (1905–1973), Australian rules footballer for Hawthorn
- Bill Carey (curler) (born 1954), Canadian curler and coach

== See also ==
- William Cary (disambiguation)
