= Jesse Ramsden =

18th-century British mathematician and scientific instrument maker (1735–1800)

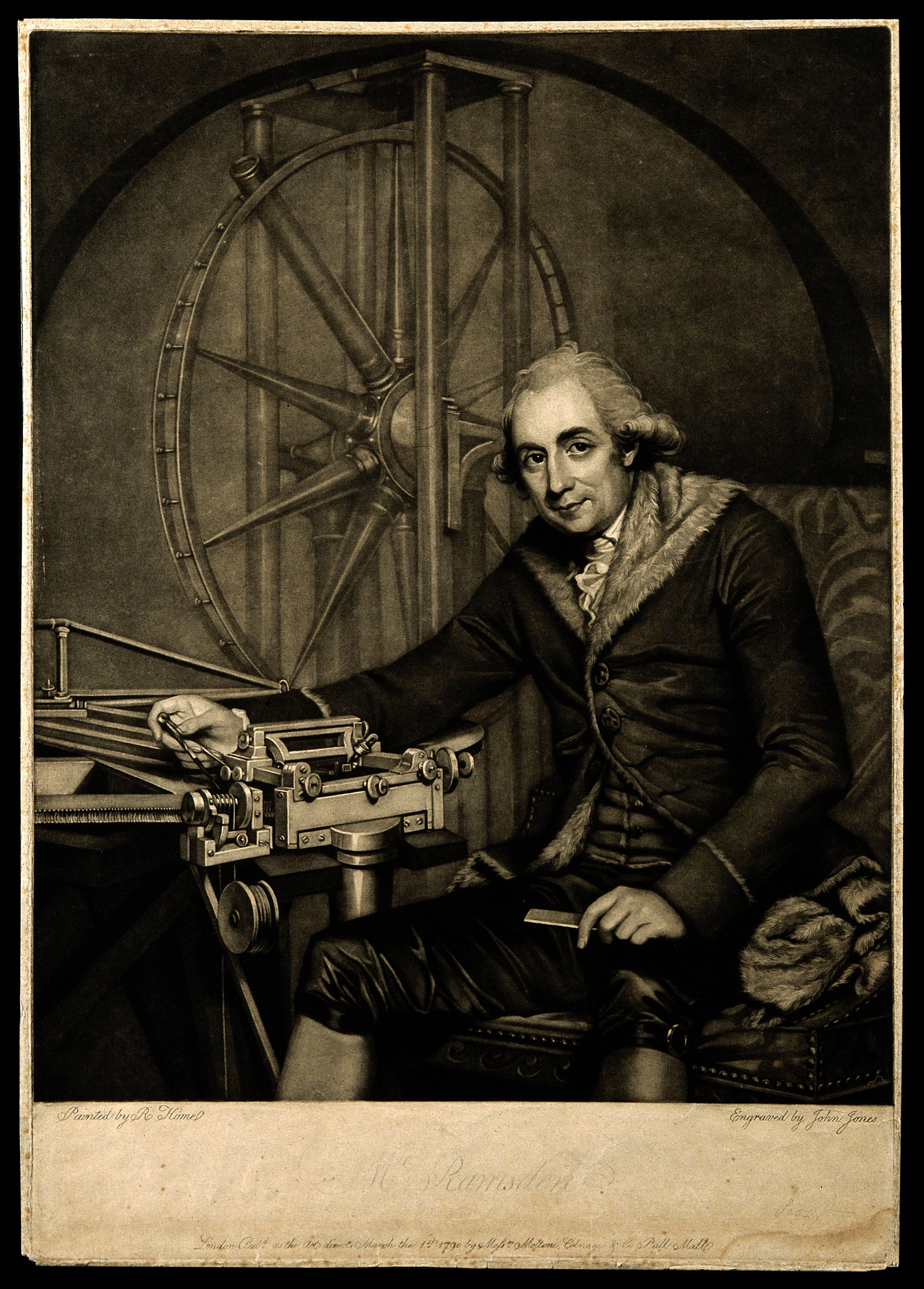
- Mezzotint by J. Jones, 1790, after Robert Home. This, the only portrait of Ramsden shows him with the dividing engine in front of him and a great circle made for the Palermo Astronomical Observatory behind him. Ramsden never wore fur coats but the artist added it because the painting commemorated an order from the Empress of Russia that Ramsden had worked on.
- Born: 6 October 1735; Salterhebble, Yorkshire, England
- Died: 5 November 1800 (aged 65); Brighton, Sussex, England
- Known for: Dividing engine Ramsden eyepiece Surveying instruments Optical telescopes
- Awards: Copley Medal (1795)
- Scientific career
- Fields: astronomical optics

Jesse Ramsden FRS FRSE (6 October 1735 – 5 November 1800) was a British mathematician, astronomical and scientific instrument maker. His reputation was built on the engraving and design of dividing engines which allowed high accuracy measurements of angles and lengths in instruments. He produced instruments for astronomy that were especially well known for maritime use where they were needed for the measurement of latitudes and for his surveying instruments which were widely used for cartography and land survey both across the British Empire and outside. An achromatic eyepiece that he invented for telescopes and microscopes continues to be known as the Ramsden eyepiece.

== Life ==
Ramsden was born at Salterhebble, Halifax, West Riding of Yorkshire, England the son of Thomas Ramsden, an innkeeper and his wife Abigail née Flather.

Having attended the free school at Halifax from 1744 to 1747, he was sent at the age of twelve to his maternal uncle, Mr Craven, in the North Riding, and there studied mathematics under the Rev. Mr. Hall. After serving his apprenticeship as a cloth-worker in Halifax, he went to London where, in 1755, he became a clerk in a cloth warehouse. In 1758 he was apprenticed to a mathematical instrument maker and he proved so proficient that he was able to set up his own business only four years later. The quality and accuracy of his instruments established his reputation as the most able instrument maker in Europe for the next forty years until his death in 1800.

In 1765, Ramsden married Sarah Dollond, daughter of John Dollond, the famous maker of high quality lenses and optical instruments. Ramsden received a share in Dollond's patent achromatic lens as dowry. Little is known of their life together but Sarah did not accompany him when he moved his workshop (and home). In 1773, Ramsden moved to 199 Piccadilly but Sarah and her son lived at Haymarket at a home belonging to her father's family. At the time of her death on 29 August 1796 she lived at Hercules Buildings, off Westminster Road, Lambeth. She was buried at St Mary's, Lambeth, on 1 September 1796. In his later years he lived above the workshop with a number of his apprentices. The Ramsdens had two sons and two daughters with only one, John, living past infancy. John later became a commander in the East India Company's navy.

Ramsden's dividing engine allowed instruments to be made smaller without loss of measurement accuracy. The rights for a portable sextant designed by Ramsden and used for maritime navigation were purchased by the Board of Longitude in 1777 for £300. An additional £315 was paid to allow for its construction details to be used by other craftsmen. He also received charges for servicing of the instruments.

Ramsden was of a genial disposition, but at the same time infuriated his clients with his tardiness in delivering their purchases, particularly of larger commissions. His three-year delay in providing William Roy with the theodolite for the Anglo-French Survey (1784–1790) provoked a public row within the portals of the Royal Society and in its Philosophical Transactions. Many delays could be attributed to Ramsden's quest for perfection, as he continually refined his designs as the slightest shortcomings were revealed.

Ramsden was elected to the Royal Society in 1786 and to the Royal Society of Edinburgh in (probably) 1798. The Copley Medal of the Royal Society was bestowed upon him in 1795 for his 'various inventions and improvements in philosophical instruments.’

Ramsden's health began to fail and he traveled to Brighton on the south coast to try to benefit from its better climate; he died there on 5 November 1800. He was buried at St James's Church, Piccadilly on 13 November. His instrument-making business in London was taken over by his foreman, Matthew Berge until his death in 1819. The estate passed on to his son. Many of Ramsden's apprentices such as William Cary went on to establish their own instrument-making ventures. Others like Edward Troughton incorporated ideas from Ramsden into their own designs.

== Ramsden's instruments ==
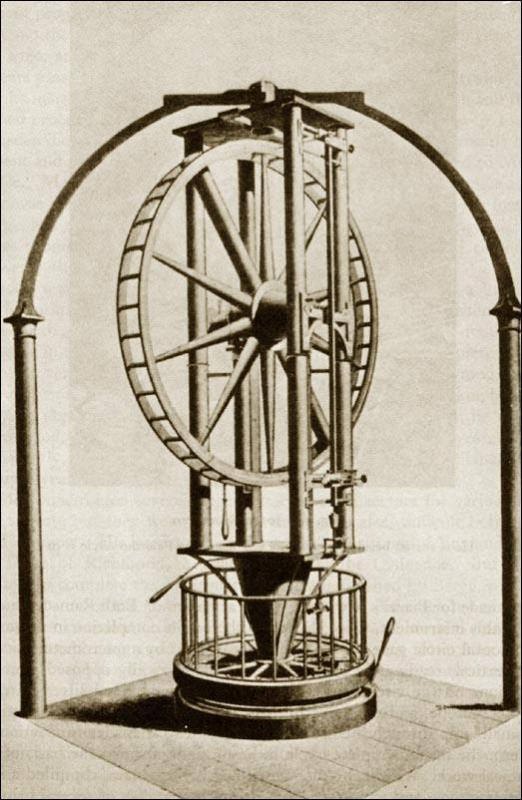
The 5-foot diameter Palermo circle manufactured by Jesse Ramsden to measure apparent positions of astronomical objects.

=== Dividing engines ===
Ramsden created one of the first high-quality dividing engines. This led to his speciality in dividing circles, which began to supersede the quadrants in observatories towards the end of the 18th century. He published a Description of an Engine for dividing Mathematical Instruments in 1777.

=== Other instruments ===
He also built an early plate electrostatic generator in 1768.

=== Surveying instruments ===
In about 1785, Ramsden provided General William Roy a new large theodolite which was used for the measurement of the latitude and longitude separations of London (Greenwich) and Paris and later for the Principal Triangulation of Great Britain. This work provided the basis for the subsequent Ordnance Survey of the counties of Britain.

=== Telescopes ===
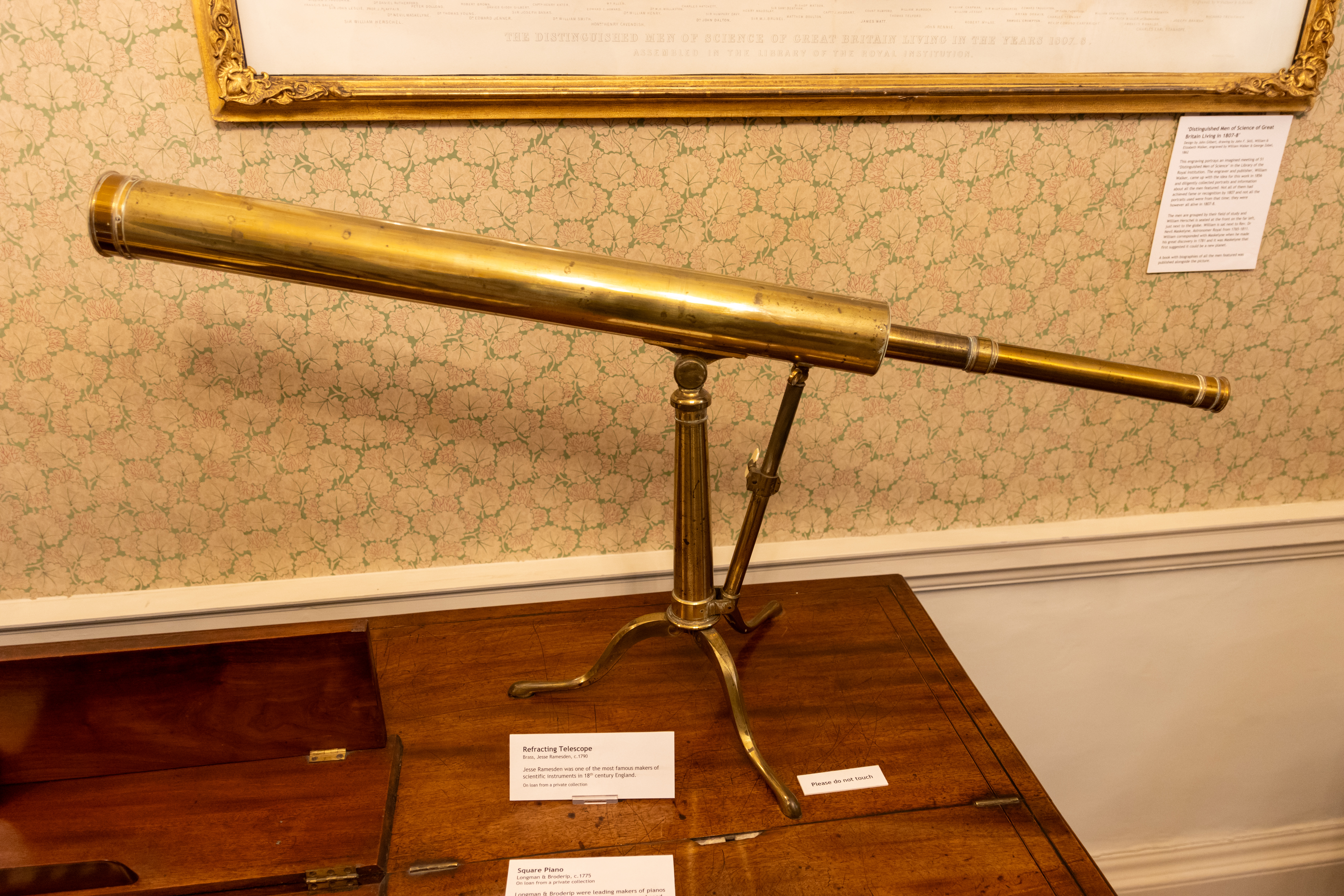
A brass refractor telescope by Jesse Ramsden at the Herschel Museum of Astronomy in Bath

Ramsden is also responsible for the achromatic eyepiece named after him. In its simplest form it consists of two planoconvex lenses with the curved sides facing each other and separated by a gap of about 2/3 of their focal length. It had the additional advantage of allowing a greater distance (or eye relief) between the lens and the eye. It thus also allowed sunshades and prisms to be placed before it.

The exit pupil of an eyepiece was once called the Ramsden disc in his honour.

In 1791, he completed the Shuckburgh telescope, an equatorial mounted refracting telescope.

His most celebrated work was a 5-feet vertical circle, which was finished in 1789 and was used by Giuseppe Piazzi at the Palermo Astronomical Observatory in constructing his catalogue of stars and in the discovery of the dwarf planet Ceres on 1 January 1801.

=== Micrometers ===
He was the first to carry out in practice a method of reading off angles (first suggested in 1768 by the Duc de Chaulnes) by measuring the distance of the index from the nearest division line by means of a micrometer screw which moves one or two fine threads placed in the focus of a microscope.

== Honours ==
Ramsden Rock in Antarctica is named after Jesse Ramsden.

== Bibliography ==
- Clerke, Agnes Mary (1896). "Ramsden, Jesse" . Dictionary of National Biography. Vol. 47. pp. 265–267.
- Dunn, Richard (2008). "An infuriating genius. A review of the book by Anita McConnell: Jesse Ramsden (1735–1800): London's leading scientific instrument maker". Notes and Records of the Royal Society. 62 (3): 331–334. doi:10.1098/rsnr.2008.0016.
- Insley, Jane (2008). The Tale of the Great Theodolites (PDF). FIG - International Federation of Surveyors Working Week on Integrating the Generations. Sweden.
- Kern, Ralf (2010), Wissenschaftliche Instrumente in ihrer Zeit. Vom 15. – 19. Jahrhundert. Verlag der Buchhandlung Walther König, ISBN 978-3-86560-772-0
- McConnell, Anita (2007), Jesse Ramsden (1735–1800): London's leading scientific instrument maker, Aldershot, England Burlington, Vt.: Ashgate, ISBN 978-0-754661368
- Piazzi (1803). "Account of the life and labours of the late Mr. Ramsden. Letter of Professor Giuseppe Piazzi (of Palermo) to M. de Lalande". Philosophical Magazine: 253–262.
- "Ramsden the optician". The Mirror of Literature, Amusement and Instruction. 10 (266): 80. 1827 – via Project Gutenberg.
- Roy, William (1787). "An Account of the Mode Proposed to be Followed in Determining the Relative Situation of the Royal Observatories of Greenwich and Paris. Plates follow text". Philosophical Transactions of the Royal Society of London. 77: 188–226. doi:10.1098/rstl.1787.0019. S2CID 186214773.
- Roy, William (1790). "An Account of the Trigonometrical Operation, Whereby the Distance between the Meridians of the Royal Observatories of Greenwich and Paris Has Been Determined". Philosophical Transactions of the Royal Society of London. 80: 111–254. doi:10.1098/rstl.1790.0015. S2CID 186211548.
