= William Cary (instrument maker) =

William Cary (1759–16 November 1825) was an English scientific-instrument maker. Trained under Jesse Ramsden, he produced numerous scientific instruments including mechanical calculators, measuring instruments, telescopes, microscopes, navigation and survey equipment.

William Cary was born to George and Mary Cary. He had three brothers, the eldest George (ca. 1753–1830) was a haberdasher while the second brother John, was a mapmaker who also worked with William and the last, Francis (ca. 1756–1836) was an engraver. Cary learnt the skills for producing instruments as an apprentice of Jesse Ramsden (1735–1800).

The instruments made by William Cary were used around the world including Russia and India. He also made instruments for the English chemist William Hyde Wollaston. After his death in 1825, the firm was taken over by Charles Gould who may have trained briefly under William Cary.
