= Toshiko Akiyoshi discography =

- Studio albums: 59
- Live albums: 20
- Compilation albums: 9
- Singles: 1
- Video albums: 4

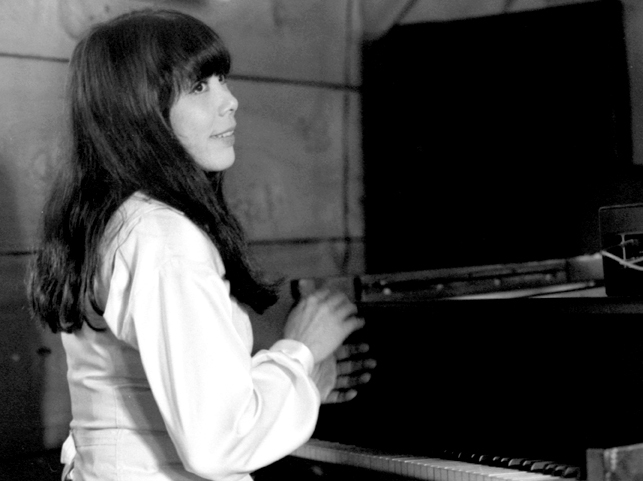
Toshiko Akiyoshi in 1978

Since her debut recording for Norgran Records in 1954, jazz pianist, composer, arranger and big band leader Toshiko Akiyoshi has recorded continually – almost exclusively as a leader of small jazz combos and of her big bands – averaging one studio album release per year for well over 50 years. She has also recorded several live albums in solo, small combo and big band settings, including three big band concert videos. Akiyoshi has released multiple albums for Victor / BMG, Nippon Columbia, Toshiba, Discomate, Nippon Crown and other labels in Japan and for Norgran / Verve, RCA, Columbia / Sony, Concord and her own Ascent label in the US. All of her big band recordings and nearly all of her other early works have been re-issued on CDs over the years.

== Toshiko Akiyoshi recordings as leader or co-leader ==
- Toshiko's Piano (1954, Norgran) – also released as Amazing Toshiko Akiyoshi
- Toshiko at Mocambo [live] (1954, Rockwell / Polydor)
- The Toshiko Trio - George Wein Presents Toshiko (1956, Storyville)
- Toshiko – Her Trio, Her Quartet (1956, Storyville)
- Toshiko and Leon Sash at Newport [live] (1957, Verve)
- The Many Sides of Toshiko (1957, Verve)
- United Notions (1958, MetroJazz)
- The Toshiko–Mariano Quartet (1961, Candid)
- Long Yellow Road (1961, Asahi Sonorama) – also released as Toshiko Akiyoshi Recital
- Toshiko Meets Her Old Pals (1961, King Records)
- Toshiko–Mariano Quartet (in West Side) (1963, Takt/Nippon Columbia)
- East & West (1963, RCA Victor)
- The Country and Western Sound of Jazz Pianos (1963, Dauntless) – also released as Together, Steve Kuhn and Toshiko Akiyoshi (Chiaroscuro Records)
- Miwaku No Jazz (1963, Victor Japan) – also known as Fascinating Jazz (魅惑のジャズ)
- Toshiko & Modern Jazz (1964, Vee-Jay) – also released as Toshiko Mariano and her Big Band Recorded in Tokio (Nippon Columbia)
- Lullabies for You (1965, Nippon Columbia) – also known as Toshiko's Lullabies
- Toshiko at Top of the Gate [live] (1969, Nippon Columbia)
- Toshiko Akiyoshi in Japan (1970, Toshiba) – also released as Long Yellow Road - Toshiko Akiyoshi Quartet (Liberty)
- Jazz, the Personal Dimension (1971, Victor Japan)
- Meditation (1971, Dan Records)
- Sumie (1971, Victor)
- Solo Piano (1971, RCA Victor)
- Dedications (1976, Discomate)
- Dedications II (1977, Discomate) – also released outside Japan as Dedications (Inner City)
- Toshiko Plays Billy Strayhorn (1978, Discomate) – also released as A Tribute to Billy Strayhorn (JAM) and as Dedications III (Alfa)
- Finesse (1978, Concord Jazz)
- Notorious Tourist from the East (1979, Inner City) – also released as Toshiko Plays Toshiko (Discomate)
- Just Be Bop (1980, Discomate)
- Toshiko Akiyoshi Trio, 1980 In Rikuzentakata [live] (1980, Johnny's Disk)
- Tuttie Flutie (1980, Discomate)
- Toshiko Akiyoshi Trio (1983, Eastworld)
- Time Stream (1984, Eastworld)
- Interlude (1987, Concord Jazz)
- Four Seasons (1990, Nippon Crown / Ninety-One)
- Remembering Bud: Cleopatra's Dream (1990, Nippon Crown / Evidence)
- Chic Lady (1991, Ninety-One)
- Live at Birdland [live] (released 1991, recorded 1960/61 Fresh Sound)
- Dig (1993, Ninety-One)
- Toshiko Akiyoshi at Maybeck [live] (1994, Concord Jazz)
- Night and Dream (1994, Ninety-One)
- Yes, I Have No 4 Beat Today - Toshiko With Brazilian Friends (1995, Ninety-One)
- Time Stream: Toshiko Plays Toshiko (1996, Ninety-One)
- Toshiko Akiyoshi Trio Live at Blue Note Tokyo '97 [live] (1997, Ninety-One)
- Sketches of Japan (1999, Ninety-One)
- Toshiko Akiyoshi Solo Live at the Kennedy Center [live] (2000, Nippon Crown)
- New York Sketch Book (2004, Ninety-One)
- Hope (2006, Ninety-One)
- *Hope (希望) (2006, Nippon Crown) – single with Monday Michiru
- 50th Anniversary Concert in Japan [live] (2006, T-toc Records)
- Let Freedom Swing, Toshiko Akiyoshi and the SWR Big Band (2008, Hänssler)"
- Vintage (2008, T-toc Records)
- Solo Live 2004 (Live at "Studio F") [live] (2009, Studio Songs)
- Classic Encounters (2010, Studio Songs) – with Reiko Honshoh
- Jazz Conversations (2015, Victor Entertainment) – with Monday Michiru
- Toshiko Akiyoshi Plays Gershwin's "Porgy and Bess" (2016, Studio Songs)
- My Long Yellow Road (2017, Studio Songs)
- The Eternal Duo! [live] (2019, Sony) – with Lew Tabackin

=== Toshiko Akiyoshi – Lew Tabackin Big Band ===
- Kogun (1975, RCA)
- Long Yellow Road (1975, RCA)
- Tales of a Courtesan (Oirantan) (1976, RCA) – also known as HANA KAI TAN (花魁譚)
- Road Time [live] (1976, RCA)
- Insights (1976, RCA)
- March of the Tadpoles (1977, RCA)
- Live at Newport '77 [live] (1977, RCA)
- Live at Newport II [live] (1977, RCA)
- Salted Gingko Nuts (1978, Ascent) – also known as SHIO GIN NAN (塩銀杏)
- Sumi-e (1979, Insights)
- Farewell (1980, RCA)
- From Toshiko with Love (1981, Baystate) – also released as Tanuki's Night Out
- European Memoirs (1982, Baystate)

=== Toshiko Akiyoshi Jazz Orchestra featuring Lew Tabackin ===
- Ten Gallon Shuffle (1984, Baystate)
- Wishing Peace (1986, Ascent)
- Carnegie Hall Concert [live] (1992, Columbia)
- Desert Lady / Fantasy (1994, Columbia)
- Four Seasons of Morita Village (1996, Novus)
- Monopoly Game (1998, Novus)
- Tribute to Duke Ellington (1999, Novus)
- Hiroshima – Rising from the Abyss [live] (2001, Video Arts)
- Last Live in Blue Note Tokyo [live] (2004, Warner Music Japan)
- Toshiko Akiyoshi Jazz Orchestra in Shanghai [live] (2010, Pony Canyon)

=== Video recordings ===
- My Elegy [live] (1984, LaserDisc Corp.)
- Strive for Jive [live] (c. 1985, V.I.E.W. Video)
- Toshiko Akiyoshi Jazz Orchestra in Shanghai [live] (2011, Pony Canyon)
- The Eternal Duo! [live] (2019, Sony)

== Compilations ==
=== General compilations ===
- Shibuya Jazz Classics: Toshiko Akiyoshi Issue (2006, Solid Records)
- The World of Toshiko Akiyoshi, u-can club / Nippon Crown / BMG Japan - 12 CD collection

=== Small combo compilations ===
- 1961 - Toshiko Akiyoshi (2001, King Jazz)
- Best Gold '89~'96 (1998, Nippon Crown)
- Best Silver '89~'96 (1998, Nippon Crown)

=== Big Band / Jazz Orchestra compilations ===
- Mosaic Select: Toshiko Akiyoshi - Lew Tabackin Big Band (2008, Mosaic Records)
- NOVUS Series '70: The Toshiko Akiyoshi - Lew Tabackin Big Band (1991, BMG / Novus)
- Eternal Best (Toshiko Akiyoshi) (1998), BMG / Victor (Japan) - also known as Best 8
- The Best of Toshiko Akiyoshi (2002, BMG / Victor)

=== Inclusion in other compilations ===
- Jazz at the Opera House (1983, CBS/Sony)
- A History of King Jazz Recordings, King Records
- Columbia Jazz: Limited Edition (1994, Sony)
- 'S Paradise, The Gershwin Songbook and Complete Gershwin Songbooks (1995, PolyGram / Verve)
- Big Band Renaissance (1996), Smithsonian Collection
- RCA Victor 80th Anniversary, Vol. 6 (1970-1979) and RCA Victor 80th Anniversary [Collector's Edition] (1997, RCA)
- The Music of Duke Ellington: Jazz Piano Essentials (2000, Concord)
- The Best of Newport '57: 50th Anniversary Collection (2007, Verve)
- Others...

== Appearances on other recordings ==
=== Appearances on other albums ===
- Shōtarō Moriyasu, etc.: The Historic Mocambo Session '54, Vol. 4 (Rockwell - Polydor (Japan)) and The Complete Historic Mocambo Session '54 (Rockwell - Polydor / Universal)
- Barney Wilen Quartet: Newport '59 (1959, Fresh Sound Records)
- Charles Mingus: Charles Mingus At Birdland - The Complete Session - BAT 5-8 (Italy, unissued), and other unauthorized releases of material from the 1961/62 Birdland recordings known as the "Boris Rose tapes"
- Charles Mingus: The Town Hall Concert (1963, United Artists), and the expanded re-issue The Complete Town Hall Concert (1994, Blue Note)
- Louie Bellson / Buddy Rich: Are You Ready for This? (1965, Roost)
- Lew Tabackin Quartet: Day Dream (1976, RCA Victor), Trackin' (1976, RCA Victor), ...
- Lew Tabackin & Warne Marsh: Tenor Gladness (1976, Discomate / Inner City) and Unsung Cat: The Life and Music of Warne Marsh (2001, Storyville)
- Various Artists: (Conrad Silvert Presents) Jazz at the Opera House (1982, Columbia)
- Various Artists: Jazz Celebration: A Tribute To Carl Jefferson (1992, Concord)
- Yoshio Suzuki: My Dear Pianists (2009, Space Shower Music (Japan))
- Others...

=== Appearances as guest big band conductor/performer ===
- University of Texas Jazz Orchestra: Sublime in Time (1983)
- DVC Night Jazz Band: The DVC Night Jazz Band featuring Toshiko Akiyoshi (2004)
- SWR Big Band: Let Freedom Swing (2008, Hänssler Verlag)

=== Appearances in other videos ===
- Monterey Jazz Festival 1975 (2007, Storyville Films)
- Jazz Shots From The West Coast, Vol. 1 (2005, Efor Films)
- Southern Crossing (1981) - Australian documentary by producer Richard Bradley
- Piano Grand, A Smithsonian Celebration (2000, Sony)
- Jazz Is My Native Language (c. 1982) - documentary

== Discography notes ==
1. In the main chronological listing, years shown may reflect the album's original recording session year(s), which is typically, but not always, the album's initial release year. More specific release date info can be found in the infobox on each album's article page.
2. This discography includes some albums that were released only in Japan and others that were released only in the USA or Europe.
3. Occasionally, a single recording, released in two different regions and/or at different times by different record labels, will have two different titles. Example: Toshiko's Piano and Amazing Toshiko Akiyoshi.
4. Different record labels have occasionally re-used the same or similar title for different Akiyoshi albums. Examples: Long Yellow Road (3), Sumie (2), Time Stream (2), etc.
5. Some Akiyoshi albums, when exported from Japan, may be identified in listings only by the Japanese version of the (original English) title. For example SHIO GIN NAN = Salted Gingko Nuts and HANA KAI TAN = Tales of a Courtesan.
6. In some listings of Akiyoshi albums exported from Japan, a recording may be identified by the re-translation into English of the recording's common Japanese title, which may not match the original English album title. For example, the big band album European Memoirs, in Japan is typically referred to as simply MEMOWARU (メモワール = Japanese phonetic spelling of the word "Memoir"). When re-translated back into English, this title sometimes becomes Memoir (without the preceding "European") or Memory (i.e. the English translation of the English (French) word "Memoir(e)").
