= Toshiko Akiyoshi – Lew Tabackin Big Band discography =

- Studio albums: 16
- Live albums: 7
- Compilation albums: 4
- Video albums: 3

== Toshiko Akiyoshi – Lew Tabackin Big Band albums ==
- Kogun (1974)
- Long Yellow Road (1975)
- Tales of a Courtesan (Oirantan) (1975) – also known as HANA KAI TAN (花魁譚)
- Road Time (1976)
- Insights (1976)
- March of the Tadpoles (1977)
- Live at Newport '77 (1977)
- Live at Newport II (1977)
- Salted Gingko Nuts (1978) – also known as SHIO GIN NAN (塩銀杏)
- Sumi-e (1979)
- Farewell (1980) – also released as Farewell To Mingus
- From Toshiko with Love (1981) – also released as Tanuki's Night Out
- European Memoirs (1982)

== Toshiko Akiyoshi Jazz Orchestra albums ==
- Ten Gallon Shuffle (1984)
- Wishing Peace (1986)
- Carnegie Hall Concert (1991)
- Desert Lady / Fantasy (1993)
- Four Seasons of Morita Village (1996)
- Monopoly Game (1998)
- Tribute to Duke Ellington (1999)
- Hiroshima - Rising from the Abyss (2001)
- Last Live in Blue Note Tokyo (2003)
- Toshiko Akiyoshi Jazz Orchestra in Shanghai (2011)

== Video recordings ==
- My Elegy (c. 1984), LaserDisc Corp.
- Strive for Jive (c. 1993), VIEW Video
- In Shanghai (2011), Pony Canyon

Appearances in other videos:

- Monterey Jazz festival 1975 (2007), Storyville Films
- Jazz Shots From The West Coast, Vol. 1 (2005), Efor Films
- Jazz Is My Native Language (c. 1982) – documentary

== Compilation albums ==
- Mosaic Select: Toshiko Akiyoshi - Lew Tabackin Big Band (2008), Mosaic Records
- NOVUS Series '70: The Toshiko Akiyoshi - Lew Tabackin Big Band (1991), BMG / Novus
- Eternal Best (Toshiko Akiyoshi) (1998), BMG / Victor (Japan) – also known as Best 8
- The Best of Toshiko Akiyoshi (2002), BMG / Victor

Inclusion in other compilations:

- Shibuya Jazz Classics: Toshiko Akiyoshi Issue (2006), Solid Records
- The World of Toshiko Akiyoshi, u-can club / Nippon Crown / BMG Japan – 12 CD compilation
- Big Band Renaissance (1996), Smithsonian Collection
- RCA Victor 80th Anniversary, Vol. 6 (1970–1979) (1997), RCA
- Others...

== Honors and awards ==
See Toshiko Akiyoshi – Lew Tabackin Big Band#Honors and awards

== References / External links ==
- Allmusic Toshiko Akiyoshi discography. Accessed 3 June 2007.
- BMG Japan, Toshiko Akiyoshi discography. Accessed 3 June 2007.
- Videoarts Music, Toshiko Akiyoshi. Accessed 3 June 2007.
- Warner Music Japan, Toshiko Akiyoshi. Accessed 3 June 2007.
- Musicmatch Guide Toshiko Akiyoshi discography. Accessed 3 June 2007.
- LA Times, LA Times Awards database, Past Grammy Award winners/nominees database. Accessed 3 June 2007.
- Down Beat magazine Critic's Poll winners database "archives". Accessed 3 June 2007.
- JAZZ CD.jp Swing Journal magazine annual disk awards (Japanese link). Accessed 3 June 2007.
