= Toshiko Akiyoshi – Lew Tabackin Big Band (Novus Series '70) =

Toshiko Akiyoshi - Lew Tabackin Big Band (Novus Series '70)

Compilation album by Toshiko Akiyoshi – Lew Tabackin Big Band
- Released: 1991
- Genre: Jazz
- Length: 57:28
- Label: BMG / Novus
- Producer: Hiroshi Isaka
- Compiler: John Snyder

Professional ratings
Review scores
Source	Rating
Allmusic link	4/5 stars

The Toshiko Akiyoshi – Lew Tabackin Big Band, Novus Series '70 is a compilation album of songs taken from the band's early RCA releases of 1974~1976.

== Track listing ==
All songs orchestrated by Toshiko Akiyoshi. All songs composed by Akiyoshi except "Yet Another Tear" (Lew Tabackin)

1. "Studio J" – 6:00 (from Insights)
2. "American Ballad" – 5:45 (from Kogun)
3. "Quadrille, Anyone?" – 6:20 (From Long Yellow Road)
4. "Children in the Temple Ground" – 5:27 (From Long Yellow Road)
5. "The First Night" – 4:51 (From Long Yellow Road)
6. "Kogun" – 10:24 (from Road Time)
7. "Since Perry" / "Yet Another Tear" – 12:30 (from Road Time)
8. "Road Time Shuffle" – 6:11 (from Road Time)

== Personnel ==
- Toshiko Akiyoshi – piano
- Lew Tabackin – tenor saxophone, flute
- Tom Peterson – tenor saxophone
- Dick Spencer – alto saxophone
- Gary Foster – alto saxophone
- Bill Perkins – baritone saxophone ("Studio J", "American Ballad", "The First Night", "Quadrille, Anyone", "Children in the Temple Ground")
- Bill Byrne – baritone saxophone ("Kogun", "Since Perry / Yet Another Tear", "Road Time Shuffle")
- Bobby Shew – trumpet
- Mike Price – trumpet
- Steven Huffsteter – trumpet ("Studio J", "Kogun", "Since Perry / Yet Another Tear", "Road Time Shuffle")
- Don Rader – trumpet ("American Ballad", "The First Night", "Quadrille, Anyone?", "Children in the Temple Ground")
- Richard Cooper – trumpet ("Studio J", "Kogun", "Since Perry / Yet Another Tear", "Road Time Shuffle")
- Stu Blumberg – trumpet ("The First Night", "Children in the Temple Ground")
- Lynn Nicholson – trumpet ("Quadrille, Anyone?")
- John Madrid – trumpet ("American Ballad")
- Phil Teele – bass trombone
- Charlie Loper – trombone ("Studio J", "American Ballad", "Quadrille, Anyone?", "Children in the Temple Ground", "The First Night")
- Britt Woodman – trombone ("Studio J", "American Ballad", "Quadrille, Anyone?", "Children in the Temple Ground", "The First Night")
- Jim Sawyer – trombone ("American Ballad", "Kogun", "Since Perry / Yet Another Tear", "Road Time Shuffle")
- Bill Reichenbach Jr. – trombone ("Studio J", "Kogun", "Since Perry / Yet Another Tear", "Road Time Shuffle")
- Bruce Paulson – trombone ("The First Night", "Quadrille, Anyone?", "Children in the Temple Ground")
- Jimmy Knepper – trombone ("Kogun", "Since Perry / Yet Another Tear", "Road Time Shuffle")
- Peter Donald – drums
- Don Baldwin – bass ("Studio J", "Kogun", "Since Perry / Yet Another Tear", "Road Time Shuffle")
- Gene Cherico – bass ("American Ballad", "The First Night", "Quadrille, Anyone?", "Children in the Temple Ground")

Special guests:

- Tokuko Kaga – vocal ("Children in the Temple Ground")
- Kisaku Katada – kotsuzumi ("Kogun")
- Yutaka Yazaki – ōtsuzumi ("Kogun")

== Sources / References ==
- BMG 3106-2-N album cover / liner notes
- Toshiko Akiyoshi – Lew Tabackin Big Band (Novus Series '70) review at allmusic.com
