= Mosaic Select: Toshiko Akiyoshi – Lew Tabackin Big Band =

Mosaic Select: Toshiko Akiyoshi - Lew Tabackin Big Band

Compilation album by Toshiko Akiyoshi – Lew Tabackin Big Band
- Released: 2008 October
- Recorded: 1974–1977, Los Angeles, California
- Genre: Jazz
- Length: 3:24:08
- Label: Mosaic (licensed from Sony BMG Music)
- Producer: Hiroshi Isaka (original recordings), Michael Cuscuna (this compilation)

Professional ratings
Review scores
Source	Rating
Allmusic link	4.5/5 stars

Mosaic Select: Toshiko Akiyoshi – Lew Tabackin Big Band is a 3 CD compilation album released by Mosaic Records in October 2008 and is composed of the first five studio albums recorded by the LA-based Toshiko Akiyoshi – Lew Tabackin Big Band. It is volume 33 of the "Mosaic Select" series and includes the complete contents of the previously released RCA / Victor recordings, Kogun (1974), Long Yellow Road (1975), Tales of a Courtesan (Oirantan) (1976), Insights (1976), and March of the Tadpoles (1977).

== Track listing ==
All songs orchestrated by Toshiko Akiyoshi. All songs composed by Akiyoshi except "Yet Another Tear" (Tabackin).

Disc One:

1. "Elegy" – 9:10
2. "Memory" – 10:23
3. "Kogun" – 6:06
4. "American Ballad" – 5:46
5. "Henpecked Old Man" – 9:11
6. "Long Yellow Road" – 6:23
7. "The First Night" – 4:50
8. "Opus No. Zero" – 10:04
9. "Quadrille, Anyone?" – 6:18
10. "Children in the Temple Ground" – 5:26

Disc Two

1. "Since Perry" / "Yet Another Tear" – 8:52
2. "Road Time Shuffle" – 6:25
3. "Tales of a Courtesan (Oirantan)" – 9:09
4. "Strive for Jive" – 7:46
5. "I Ain't Gonna Ask No More" – 6:06
6. "Interlude" – 4:13
7. "Village" – 11:04
8. "Studio J" – 6:00
9. "Transience" – 4:33
10. "Sumi-E" – 7:50

Disc Three:

1. "Minamata" (suite) – 21:37
  1. "Peaceful Village"
  2. "Prosperity & Consequence"
  3. "Epilogue"
2. "March of the Tadpoles" – 6:54
3. "Mobile" – 5:20
4. "Deracinated Flower" – 8:14
5. "Yellow is Mellow" – 8:53
6. "Notorious Tourist from the East" – 7:35

== Personnel ==
- Toshiko Akiyoshi – piano
- Lew Tabackin – tenor saxophone, flute, piccolo
- Tom Peterson – tenor saxophone, alto flute, clarinet
- Dick Spencer – alto saxophone, flute, clarinet
- Gary Foster – alto saxophone, soprano saxophone, flute, clarinet (except "Opus No. Zero")
- Bill Perkins – baritone saxophone, alto flute, bass clarinet
- Joe Roccisano – alto saxophone ("Opus No. Zero")
- Bobby Shew – trumpet
- Mike Price – trumpet
- Steven Huffsteter – trumpet ("Road Time Shuffle", "Tales of a Courtesan (Oirantan)", "Strive for Jive", "I Ain't Gonna Ask No More", "Interlude", "Village", "Studio J", "Transience", "Sumi-E", "Minamata", "March of the Tadpoles", "Mobile", "Deracinated Flower", "Yellow is Mellow" and "Notorious Tourist from the East")
- Richard Cooper – trumpet ("Road Time Shuffle", "Tales of a Courtesan (Oirantan)", "Strive for Jive", "I Ain't Gonna Ask No More", "Interlude", "Village", "Studio J", "Transience", "Sumi-E", "March of the Tadpoles", "Mobile", "Deracinated Flower", "Yellow is Mellow" and "Notorious Tourist from the East")
- Don Rader – trumpet ("Elegy", "Memory", "Kogun", "American Ballad", "Henpecked Old Man", "Long Yellow Road", "The First Night", "Opus Number Zero", "Quadrille Anyone?", "Children in the Temple Ground", "Since Perry" / "Yet Another Tear")
- Stu Blumberg – trumpet ("The First Night", "Opus Number Zero", "Children in the Temple Ground")
- John Madrid – trumpet ("Elegy", "Memory", "Kogun", "American Ballad", "Henpecked Old Man" and "Long Yellow Road")
- Lynn Nicholson – trumpet ("Quadrille Anyone?", "Since Perry" / "Yet Another Tear")
- Jerry Hey – trumpet ("Minamata")
- Phil Teele – bass trombone
- Charlie Loper – trombone
- Britt Woodman – trombone (except "March of the Tadpoles", "Mobile", "Deracinated Flower", "Yellow is Mellow" and "Notorious Tourist from the East")
- Bill Reichenbach Jr. – trombone ("Road Time Shuffle", "Tales of a Courtesan", "I Ain't Gonna Ask No More", "Interlude", "Studio J", "Transience", "Sumi-E", "Minamata", "March of the Tadpoles", "Mobile", "Deracinated Flower", "Yellow is Mellow" and "Notorious Tourist from the East")
- Jim Sawyer – trombone ("Elegy", "Memory", "Kogun", "American Ballad", "Henpecked Old Man", "Long Yellow Road", "Strive for Jive" and "Village")
- Bruce Paulson – trombone ("The First Night", "Opus Number Zero", "Quadrille Anyone?", "Children in the Temple Ground", "Since Perry" / "Yet Another Tear")
- Rick Culver – trombone ("March of the Tadpoles", "Mobile", "Deracinated Flower", "Yellow is Mellow" and "Notorious Tourist from the East")
- Peter Donald – drums (except "Opus Number Zero" and "Since Perry" / "Yet Another Tear")
- Chuck Flores – drums ("Opus Number Zero" and "Since Perry" / "Yet Another Tear")
- Don Baldwin – bass ("Road Time Shuffle", "Tales of a Courtesan", "Strive for Jive", "I Ain't Gonna Ask No More", "Interlude", "Village", "Studio J", "Transience", "Sumi-E", "Minamata", "March of the Tadpoles", "Mobile", "Deracinated Flower", "Yellow is Mellow" and "Notorious Tourist from the East")
- Gene Cherico – bass ("Elegy", "Memory", "Kogun", "American Ballad", "Henpecked Old Man", "Long Yellow Road", "The First Night", "Opus Number Zero", "Quadrille Anyone?", "Children in the Temple Ground" and "Since Perry" / "Yet Another Tear")

Special guests:

- Scott Elsworth – voice ("Memory")
- Tokuko Kaga – vocal ("Children in the Temple Ground")
- King Errisson – congas ("Village")
- Hisao Kanze – utai / Nō chant ("Minamata")
- Tadao Kamei – ōtsuzumi ("Minamata")
- Hayao Uzawa – kotsuzumi ("Minamata")
- (Monday) Michiru Mariano – voice ("Minamata")
- Hiromitsu Katada – kakko ("Sumi-E")
- Emil Richards – percussion ("Notorious Tourist from the East")

== Sources / References ==
- Mosaic Select MS-033, Mosaic Records
- Mosaic Select 33, Toshiko Akiyoshi - Lew Tabackin Big Band at Allmusic.com
