= Long Yellow Road =

Long Yellow Road may refer to:

- "Long Yellow Road," a musical composition by jazz pianist and bandleader Toshiko Akiyoshi
- Long Yellow Road (Toshiko Akiyoshi Trio album), a 1961 jazz trio album
- Toshiko Akiyoshi in Japan, a.k.a. Long Yellow Road, a 1970 jazz quartet album
- Long Yellow Road (Toshiko Akiyoshi – Lew Tabackin Big Band album), a 1975 big band album
- My Long Yellow Road, a 2017 solo piano recording by Toshiko Akiyoshi.
