= Scott Ellsworth =

American radio host

- Born: Harvey Charles Ellsworth; January 4, 1927 (age 99); Plymouth, Pennsylvania, U.S.
- Occupations: Radio personality, news anchor, tv host, actor
- Years active: 1952–present
- Known for: Host of Scott's Place (1968–1972, 1992–present)
- Children: 6

Scott Ellsworth (née Harvey Charles Ellsworth, January 4, 1927) is an American radio personality, news presenter, and actor. The host of Scott's Place, a jazz radio broadcast that came to prominence in the late 1960s, he has been on the air at Financial News Network, KFI, KCOP-TV, KNX-TV in Los Angeles and KWXY in Cathedral City, California.

== Early life and education ==
Scott Ellsworth was born Harvey Charles Ellsworth in Plymouth, Pennsylvania in 1927. He moved with his family to Pompton Lakes, New Jersey where he graduated from Pompton Lakes High School in 1944. His father, Harvey Warren Ellsworth, was as a "song plugger" who also played the trumpet and led Ellsworth to his first inspiration to go into the arts and entertainment. His father was also a vocalist first at KDKA in Pittsburgh in and then to New York City on NBC radio, movie theaters and stage productions. Ellsworth would play the trumpet and cornet during high school up until he entered the Armed Forces during WWII. Directly following high school School Ellsworth served in the United States Merchant Marine, he would serve in the Pacific Theater of the war.

Following his military service, Ellsworth moved to Brooklyn, New York in 1948 and enrolled in New York University in Manhattan. He signed up for a speech class, and was told by the professor he had a "'professional sounding voice" and could make it "his profession". Ellsworth earned a Bachelors of Arts degree in both Psychology and Drama from NYU in 1952. After graduating Ellsworth moved to Montrose, Colorado to pursue his dream in broadcasting after having cut an audio, audition disc for producer Pat Kelly at NBC studios in New York.

== Radio and television career ==
=== 1952–1965: Colorado and Utah ===
In 1952, Ellsworth moved his family to Montrose, Colorado where he worked in numerous capacities as newscaster, program manager and announcer for KUBC at $400 a month. They allowed Ellsworth to exercise a number of ideas he had for the station. In 1955 the KUBC owner bought KVOD in Denver and wanted Ellsworth to become program director; he moved to Denver and worked in radio and T.V. broadcasting for the next 5 years for KBTV and KVOD. Ellsworth eventually resigned from his position at KVOD and moved to station KLZ in Denver. He would create successful shows such as "Active Radio" which was an on the spot news and events broadcast. He would soon move back to KVOD (now KHOW) as operations manager. Another ownership change and other difficult circumstances with management prompted Ellsworth to eventually move to KALL, an ABC affiliate in Salt Lake City.

In 1963 Ellsworth resigned from KHOW and moved his family from Colorado to Salt Lake City where he served as a newscaster and program director at KALL (1963–65). KVOD was an ABC affiliate station, the primary ABC network business manager helped Ellsworth secure the position at KALL at the top of the pay scale (ABC affiliate in Salt Lake City). In 18 months of moving there Ellsworth and his family realized this was not the right position or the location they ultimately desired to live in.

=== 1965–1984: Los Angeles, California ===
On June 12, 1965, Ellsworth traveled to Los Angeles looking for work and was doing taping for TV commercials, he visited the KFI studio (affiliate of NBC), where he was offered a job after auditioning for KFI station manager Pat Kelly. He was given duties of being a staff announcer going from studio to studio doing commercial and station IDs, as well as other on-air responsibilities. On June 5, 1968, Ellsworth was the on-site reporter for KFI during Robert F. Kennedy's victory speech for the California, Democratic Party primary. He was literally within arm's distance of witnessing and reporting on Kennedy's assassination at the hands of Sirhan Sirhan.

Ellsworth moved his family to the Southern California/Los Angeles region settling in the Reseda area in the San Fernando Valley, just north of the KFI, Burbank studios. He worked for KFI radio and then KCBS-FM in 1973. He later worked for KCOP-TV as a newscaster, sportscaster, writer, announcer and talk show host for several years. At KCOP-TV Ellsworth produced, wrote and hosted Daybreak and Who Can I Turn To which were weekly talk shows dealing with financial and medical topics. For 2 years he was the talk show host for KNX-TV's (Los Angeles) Noontime midday show. In 1974 Ellsworth lent his talent to the Toshiko Akiyoshi/Lew Tabackin Big Band album Kogun. His voice is heard on the track Memory as part of a narrative and story telling relating to Japanese folklore. Memory is also included on the 2008 Mosaic 3 CD compilation, Mosaic Select: Toshiko Akiyoshi – Lew Tabackin Big Band.

In 1965 KFI's station manager Pat Kelly who suggested Ellsworth use the name "Scott." In August 1984 Ellsworth officially changed his name from "Harvey Charles Ellsworth" to his professional and stage name, "Scott Ellsworth."

In early 1981 Ellsworth signed on with the Financial News Network as news anchor. In 1983, Financial News Network (FNN) established a 24-hour feed on cable TV only. At night, it added SCORE (television), a mini-network that aired sports events and news. Ellsworth become the evening news anchor and interviewer for FNN, broadcasting out of their Santa Monica studio. FNN was sold to CNBC around 1991, and Ellsworth went back to being a jazz music DJ, hosting Scott's Place on KWXY from 1992 until the station traded hands around 2012.

=== Scott's Place ===
Ellsworth created and hosted on the radio program Scott's Place. It aired on KFI-AM 640 in Los Angeles from 1968 through 1974, Monday through Saturday for 4 hours live midnight to 4 am. Ellsworth moved the show to KWXY near Palm Springs during the 1990s, and broadcast from KWXY for ten years. He left KWXY when the format changed in 2011. Ellworth continued his on-line radio program from his own studio, which he initiated in April 2014.

NBC was trying to finally get out of the radio business in 1968. During this transition their affiliate KFI was losing numerous DJs to include Al "Jazzbeaux" Collins who would eventually move to the San Francisco Bay area. With the sudden exit of Collins, Scott Ellsworth was able to obtain a program time slot. The new show, Scott's Place, aired midnight until 4:00 am daily and featured jazz and big band music, interspersed with interviews with musicians and entertainers. Due to KFI's wide distribution, the show was heard across the United States and gained national attention.

Artists would bring some of their favorite recordings to Scott's Place and talk about their music and careers over a 2 to 3-hour period. Count Basie recorded a song written especially for Ellsworth, Scott's Place composed by Sammy Nestico (recorded on the Basie Have and Nice Day LP) This became the opening theme music for Ellsworth's show. Ellsworth also did special broadcasts from the Monterey Jazz Festival, Disneyland's "All That Jazz Weekend" and other live locations featuring jazz artists.

In early-1972, Ellsworth was approached by KFI to change his format to popular Rock & Roll. His last guest was Johnny Mercer. Ellsworth's interviews from the show are archived at the American Jazz Institute in Pasadena, California.

As an extension of the radio program, for a short time Ellsworth hosted his own music performance venue at "Torches West" in Woodland Hills starting in June 1972. Tex Beneke offered his band for the first weekend and the venue also hosted the bands of Freddy Martin, Charlie Barnett and vocalist Kay Starr. It only latest four weeks due to less than desired attendance and the heavy financial burden taken on by Ellsworth. For starting this venue and his past support of artists, he received the "Friend of the Musicians" honor from the American Federation of Musicians (AF of M) local 47 in Los Angeles due to his continual support for the preservation of jazz.

=== Acting career ===
Ellsworth began working as an actor in the early 1970s. His credits include TV shows and movies, including Girls Are for Loving (1973), The F.B.I. (1972–1973), Cannon (1975), The Moneychangers (1976), 79 Park Avenue (1977), The Rockford Files (1977–1978), Grandpa Goes to Washington (1978–1979), H.O.T.S. (1979), Beyond Westworld (1980), and The A-Team (1985), among others. He has been featured in theater productions to include Hostile Witness, The Best Man, Becket, Move Over, Mrs Markham, Social Security and Who's Afraid of Virginia Woolf?.

== Education career ==
Ellsworth was an adjunct professor in the Communication and Media studies department at California State University, Long Beach. He was also an instructor at College of the Desert, Santa Monica College and the Don Martin School of Radio and Television Arts and Sciences.

== Radio and T.V. program/station affiliation ==
Years	Station	Show or occupation	Media
1952–1955	KUBC	Producer/News Anchor	Radio
1955–1963	KVOD, KLZ, KBTV, KHOW	Producer/News Anchor	Radio and television
1963–1965	KALL	Producer/News Anchor	Radio
1966–1972	KFI	Scott's Place/News Anchor	Radio
1973	KGBS-FM	News Anchor	Radio
1975–1976	KNX-TV	Noontime/talk show host	Television
1972–1981	KCOP-TV	News anchor/talk show host	Television
1981–1985	Financial News Network	News Anchor/Commentator	Cable television
1985–2012	KWXY and syndication	Scott's Place/Mid-day program, special features	Radio
2014–present	independent	Scott's Place	Radio

== Television appearances (partial list) ==
Year	Title	Role	Production company
1971–72	O'Hara	two episodes	Universal
1972–73	The F.B.I.	two episodes	QM Productions
1973	General Hospital	Network Executive	ABC
1975	Cannon	four episodes	QM Productions
1976	Days of Our Lives	Navy Medical Doctor	NBC
1977–78	Rockford Files	four episodes	Universal
1978	Lou Grant	T.V. Newsman	MTM Enterprises
1978	Young and the Restless	Prosecuting Attorney	CBS
1980	Sanford	Playboy	Tandem Productions
1980	Beyond Westworld	T.V. Commentator	MGM Television
1985	The A-Team	T.V. Newsman	Cannell Entertainment

== Filmography ==
Year	Title	Role	Production company
1971	Dead Men Tell No Tales	Dave	20th Century
1973	Girls Are For Loving	James L. Whitney	Derio Prod.
1973	A Christmas Visit	Supporting Role	Zavada
1976	The Moneychangers	Treasury Secretary	Ross Hunter Productions
1977	79 Park Avenue	Vice-detective	Universal
1977	Secrets	Love Interest	Paramount
1978	Grandpa Goes to Washington	Senator	Paramount
1978	To Save His Life	Movie Director	20th Century
1978	Loose Change	Play Director	Universal
1979	H.O.T.S.	Professor	Great Amer. Movie Mach.
1979	Anatomy of a Mugging	Detective	Paramount
