= Tuttie Flutie =

Studio album by Toshiko Akiyoshi
- Released: 1980
- Recorded: June 1980
- Venue: Los Angeles
- Genre: Jazz
- Length: 34:38
- Label: Discomate Records
- Producer: Toshiko Akiyoshi

Toshiko Akiyoshi chronology
Toshiko Akiyoshi Trio, 1980 In Rikuzentakata (1980)	Tuttie Flutie (1980)	Toshiko Akiyoshi Trio (1983)

Alternative Cover
- cover with obi strip

Tuttie Flutie is a jazz album recorded by the Toshiko Akiyoshi Trio with a flute quartet. It was released in 1980 on the Discomate (Japan) record label.

== Track listing ==
All songs arranged by Toshiko Akiyoshi. All songs composed by Toshiko Akiyoshi except as noted:

LP side A

1. "Tuttie Flutie" – 5:14
2. "Falling Petal" (Tabackin) – 5:27
3. "Manhã De Carnaval" (Bonfá) – 5:23

LP side B

1. "Blue Dream" – 8:33
2. "Chic Lady" – 5:58
3. "Last Minute Blues" – 4:03

== Personnel ==
- Toshiko Akiyoshi – piano
- Bob Bowman – bass
- Joey Baron – drums
- Louise diTullio – flute
- Geraldine Rotella – flute
- Monday (Michiru Akiyoshi) Mariano – flute
- Susan Greenberg – flute

== References / External Links ==
- Discomate DSP-8107
