= Toshiko Akiyoshi Trio, 1980 In Rikuzentakata =

Live album by Toshiko Akiyoshi
- Released: 16 April 2014 (CD)
- Recorded: 13 June 1980
- Venue: Shimin Kaikan Dai Hall, Rikuzentakata, Iwate, Japan
- Genre: Jazz
- Length: 76:52
- Label: Johnny's Disk

Toshiko Akiyoshi chronology
Just Be Bop (1980)	Toshiko Akiyoshi Trio, 1980 In Rikuzentakata (2014)	Tuttie Flutie (1980)

Toshiko Akiyoshi Trio, 1980 In Rikuzentakata is a live concert album of the Toshiko Akiyoshi trio recorded in June, 1980 in the Shimin Kaikan Dai Hall in Rikuzentakata, Iwate, Japan.

== Track listing ==
1. "Long Yellow Road" – 10:34
2. "Old Devil Moon" (Lane, Harburg) – 8:55
3. emcee speaks – 3:08
4. "I Let a Song Go Out of My Heart" (Ellington) – 6:49
5. "Two Bass Hit" (Gillespie, Lewis) – 7:33
6. "My Elegy" – 7:56
7. "Autumn Sea" – 12:08
8. "Notorious Tourist From The East" – 8:58
9. emcee speaks – 4:21
10. "Tempus Fugit" (Powell) – 6:30

all songs composed by Akiyoshi except as noted

== Personnel ==
- Toshiko Akiyoshi – piano
- Bob Bowman – bass
- Joey Baron – drums
