= Tenor Gladness =

Studio album by Lew Tabackin and Warne Marsh
- Released: 1977
- Recorded: October 13–14, 1976
- Studio: Sage & Sound Studios, Los Angeles, CA
- Genre: Jazz
- Length: 38:49
- Label: Disco Mate; DSP 5004
- Producer: Toshiko Akiyoshi

Warne Marsh chronology
Lee Konitz Meets Warne Marsh Again (1976)	Tenor Gladness (1977)	Crosscurrents (1977)

Lew Tabackin chronology
Day Dream (1976)	Tenor Gladness (1976)	Dual Nature (1977)

Tenor Gladness, is an album by saxophonists Lew Tabackin and Warne Marsh recorded in 1976 and originally released on the Japanese Disco Mate label before being released in the U. S. on Inner City Records.

== Reception ==
Professional ratings
Review scores
Source	Rating
Allmusic	4.5/5 stars

The Allmusic review commented: "it finds both Marsh and Tabackin in competitive and creative form".

== Track listing ==
1. "Basic #2" (Lew Tabackin) – 6:42
2. "Easy" (Warne Marsh) – 5:59
3. "March of the Tadpoles" (Toshiko Akiyoshi) – 6:20
4. "Hangin' Loose"(Akiyoshi) – 8:18
5. "New-ance"(Tabackin) – 3:58
6. "Basic #1" (Marsh) – 7:32

== Personnel ==
- Lew Tabackin (tracks 1 & 3–6), Warne Marsh (tracks 1–4 & 6) – tenor saxophone
- Toshiko Akiyoshi – piano (track 2)
- John Heard – bass
- Larry Bunker – drums
