= The Best of Toshiko Akiyoshi =

Greatest hits album by Toshiko Akiyoshi – Lew Tabackin Big Band
- Released: 23 October 2002
- Genre: Jazz
- Length: 69:58
- Label: BMG Japan

The Best of Toshiko Akiyoshi is a compilation album of songs taken from BMG Japan releases of the Toshiko Akiyoshi – Lew Tabackin Big Band and the Toshiko Akiyoshi Jazz Orchestra featuring Lew Tabackin.

== Track listing ==
All songs orchestrated by Toshiko Akiyoshi. All songs composed by Akiyoshi except "Tanuki's Night Out" (Lew Tabackin)

1. "Long Yellow Road"
2. "Kogun"
3. "Elegy"
4. "Quadrille, Anyone?"
5. "Children in the Temple Ground"
6. "Sumi-e"
7. "Tanuki's Night Out"
8. "Chasing After Love"
9. "Duke for the Ages"
