= John Madrid =

- Johnny Madrid, circa 1975

Background information
- Born: John R. Madrid; Monterey Park, California, United States
- Origin: Monterey Park, California, United States
- Died: August 12, 1990 (aged 42) Los Angeles
- Genres: Big Band; Jazz rock and roll
- Occupations: Instrumental studio musician, trumpet
- Instruments: Trumpet flugelhorn
- Years active: 1966–1990
- Labels: Capitol; Pacific

John R. Madrid (January 2, 1948 – February 21, 1990) was a jazz and pop trumpeter, active mainly from 1966 to 1989. He was most notable professionally as a lead trumpet artist due to his accuracy and endurance.

== Career ==
=== Growing up in Los Angeles and education ===
John Madrid was born in Los Angeles, California, grew up in the East Los Angeles suburb of Monterey Park, and graduated from Montebello High School in 1966. In high school he played with the local rock-and-roll band Thee Enchantments. Madrid's teachers during this time included prominent trumpet artists and educators such as Conrad Gozzo, James Stamp, Claude Gordon, Donald Reinhardt, and Bud Brisbois. The first major commercial recording Madrid is heard on is the 1966 pop hit Time Won't Let Me by The Outsiders done for Capitol Records.

=== Professional career ===
John Madrid joined the trumpet section of the Stan Kenton Orchestra in late 1967, staying with the band through 1968, touring and recording on two Capitol Records releases. In early 1969 he joined Woody Herman's big band on a European tour, splitting the lead trumpet book with Bill Chase. In 1970 he played, toured and recorded with Buddy Rich's big band and then in 1971–72 played lead with Harry James' orchestra. Madrid also briefly worked with Si Zentner's big band in 1972. In 1973 he joined Louie Bellson's big band in Los Angeles and played lead with the Orange Co. Rhythm Machine big band. He would go on that year to join and work with his mentor Bud Brisbois' in the jazz-pop group Butane. Late in 1973, he was asked by former Herman band member Tom "Bones" Malone to replace Lew Soloff with Blood, Sweat & Tears. By early 1974 Madrid moved out to Hawaii, working with major musical acts that included Don Ho and many others. In late 1975 he returned to Los Angeles to work and record with Toshiko Akiyoshi's big band. He would go on to tour with Boz Scaggs in 1976 he began traveling on the Silk Degrees tour; for the next two years he would work with Scaggs' group and on select tours into the 1980s. By 1982 Madrid settled in Las Vegas, working primarily with Wayne Newton, with whom he was featured for several years; Donna Summer, Elton John, Sonny & Cher were other acts he worked with during this time.

=== Cause of death ===
In the mid-1980's, Madrid had contracted the HIV virus. He died of complications from AIDS on February 21, 1990.

== Discography ==
=== As sideman ===
- 1966: The Outsiders, Time Won't Let Me (Capitol)
- 1968: Stan Kenton, The Jazz Compositions of Dee Barton (Capitol, )
- 1968: Stan Kenton, Finian's Rainbow (Capitol)
- 1969: Woody Herman, Live in Seattle (Moon)
- 1969: Woody Herman, Somewhere (Moon)
- 1970: Buddy Rich, Keep the Customer Satisfied (Pacific Jazz)
- 1971: Harry James, Live! in London (Sandy Hook)
- 1974: Toshiko Akiyoshi & Lew Tabackin, Kogun (RCA)
- 1975: Toshiko Akiyoshi & Lew Tabackin, Long Yellow Road (RCA)
- 1979: Gabe Baltazar, Stan Kenton Presents Gabe Baltazar (Creative World)
- 1979: Steve Spiegl, Hot (Sorcerer)
- 1980: Raja, Disco Balady (Zahr)
- 1987: Paul Cacia, Quantum Leap (Happy Hour)
- 1987: David Benoit, Freedom at Midnight (GRP)
- 1990: Bill Tole and his orchestra, On The Move (Courtney)
