= Sumie (Toshiko Akiyoshi Quartet album) =

Sumie, The Personal Aspect in Jazz

Studio album by Toshiko Akiyoshi
- Released: 1971
- Recorded: 4 March 1971
- Venue: Tokyo
- Genre: Jazz
- Label: Victor (Japan)

Toshiko Akiyoshi chronology
Meditation (1971)	Sumie, The Personal Aspect in Jazz (1971)	Solo Piano (1971)

Alternative Cover

Sumie (also released as The Personal Aspect in Jazz) is a jazz album recorded by the Toshiko Akiyoshi Quartet in Tokyo in early March 1971 and released by Victor (Japan) Records. It is not to be confused with the 1979 release, Sumie by the Toshiko Akiyoshi – Lew Tabackin Big Band.

== Track listing ==
Side 'A'

1. "Sumie" (Akiyoshi)
2. "P.A.J. (再会)"

Side 'B'

1. "Euphoria" (Akiyoshi)

== Personnel ==
- Toshiko Akiyoshi – piano
- Lew Tabackin – tenor saxophone, flute
- Lyn Christie – bass
- Albert Heath – drums
