= Insights (album) =

Insights (Toshiko Akiyoshi - Lew Tabackin Big Band)

Studio album by Toshiko Akiyoshi – Lew Tabackin Big Band
- Released: 1976
- Recorded: RCA Studio 'A', Hollywood, California, June 22–24, 1976
- Genre: Jazz
- Length: 40:18
- Label: Victor (Japan), RCA Victor (U.S.)
- Producer: Hiroshi Isaka

Toshiko Akiyoshi – Lew Tabackin Big Band chronology
Road Time (1976)	Insights (Toshiko Akiyoshi - Lew Tabackin Big Band) (1976)	March of the Tadpoles (1977)

Alternative cover
- RCA Victor (U.S.) LP album cover

Professional ratings
Review scores
Source	Rating
Allmusic link	4/5 stars
The Rolling Stone Jazz Record Guide	5/5 stars

Insights is the fourth studio recording of the Toshiko Akiyoshi – Lew Tabackin Big Band and was voted "Jazz Album of the Year" in the 1978 Down Beat magazine critic's poll. It received the Swing Journal magazine 1976 Gold Disk prize in Japan and was nominated for a 1978 Grammy award in the USA for Best Jazz Instrumental Performance by a Big Band.

All tracks from this album are also included on the 2008 Mosaic 3 CD compilation, Mosaic Select: Toshiko Akiyoshi - Lew Tabackin Big Band.

The album also includes the jazz suite Minamata, reflecting the transition of the Minamata Bay area from one of peaceful existence, to prosperity and consequence, amid the spread of the devastating Minamata disease from mercury released into the sea by a chemical factory owned by Chisso.

== Track listing ==
All songs composed and arranged by Toshiko Akiyoshi:

LP side A

1. "Studio J" – 6:07
2. "Transience" – 4:40
3. "SUMIE" – 7:55

LP side B

1. "Minamata" (suite) – 21:36
  1. "Peaceful Village"
  2. "Prosperity & Consequence"
  3. "Epilogue"

== Personnel ==
- Toshiko Akiyoshi – piano
- Lew Tabackin – tenor saxophone and flute
- Tom Peterson – tenor saxophone
- Dick Spencer – alto saxophone
- Gary Foster – alto saxophone
- Bill Perkins – baritone saxophone
- Steven Huffsteter – trumpet
- Bobby Shew – trumpet
- Mike Price – trumpet
- Richard Cooper – trumpet (except on "Minamata")
- Jerry Hey – trumpet (on "Minamata")
- Bill Reichenbach Jr. – trombone
- Charlie Loper – trombone
- Britt Woodman – trombone
- Phil Teele – bass trombone
- Don Baldwin – bass
- Peter Donald – drums

Guest Artists:

- Hisao Kanze – utai / Nō chant (on "Minamata")
- Tadao Kamei – ōtsuzumi (on "Minamata")
- Hayao Uzawa – kotsuzumi (on "Minamata")
- (Monday) Michiru Mariano – voice (on "Minamata")
- Hiromitsu Katada – kakko (on "SUMIE")

== References / External Links ==
- RCA Victor Records RVC RVP-6106
- Allmusic
- 1978 Down Beat critic's poll award winners
- 1978 Grammy nomination, Best Jazz Instrumental Performance - Big Band (LA Times link)
- 1976 Swing Journal Gold Disk Prize (Japanese link)
