= Road Time, Toshiko Akiyoshi – Lew Tabackin Big Band =

Road Time, Toshiko Akiyoshi - Lew Tabackin Big Band

Live album by Toshiko Akiyoshi – Lew Tabackin Big Band
- Released: 1976
- Recorded: Nakano Sun Plaza in Tokyo and Sankei Hall and Kosei Nenkin Kaikan in Osaka, 1976 January 30 and February 7, 8
- Genre: Jazz
- Length: 86:52
- Label: Victor (Japan), RCA Victor (U.S.)
- Producer: Hiroshi Isaka

Toshiko Akiyoshi – Lew Tabackin Big Band chronology
Tales of a Courtesan (Oirantan) (1976)	Road Time, Toshiko Akiyoshi - Lew Tabackin Big Band (1976)	Insights (1976)

Alternative cover
- RCA Victor (U.S.) LP album cover

Professional ratings
Review scores
Source	Rating
Allmusic link	4.5/5 stars
Nicholson, Stuart.	"Essential"
The Rolling Stone Jazz Record Guide	4/5 stars

Road Time was the first live concert recording of the Toshiko Akiyoshi – Lew Tabackin Big Band. The recording was made at three concerts in Tōkyō and Ōsaka, during a 1976 Japan tour and the double album received a 1977 Grammy Award nomination in the "Best Jazz Performance - Big Band" category.

== Track listing ==
LP 1 side A

1. "Tuning Up" – 16:48
2. "Warning: Success May Be Hazardous To Your Health" – 7:33

LP 1 side B

1. "Henpecked Old Man" – 22:54

LP 2 side A

1. "Soliloquy" – 8:37
2. "Kogun" – 10:40

LP 2 side B

1. "Since Perry" / "Yet Another Tear" – 13:46
2. "Road Time Shuffle" – 6:34

All arrangements by Toshiko Akiyoshi.
All songs composed by Akiyoshi except "Yet Another Tear" (Tabackin).

== Personnel ==
- Toshiko Akiyoshi – piano
- Lew Tabackin – tenor saxophone and flute
- Tom Peterson – tenor saxophone
- Dick Spencer – alto saxophone
- Gary Foster – alto saxophone
- Bill Byrne – baritone saxophone
- Steven Huffsteter – trumpet
- Bobby Shew – trumpet
- Richard Cooper – trumpet
- Mike Price – trumpet
- Bill Reichenbach Jr. – trombone
- Jim Sawyer – trombone
- Jimmy Knepper – trombone
- Phil Teele – bass trombone
- Don Baldwin – bass
- Peter Donald – drums

Guest Artists:

- Kisaku Katada – kotsuzumi (on "Kogun")
- Yutaka Yazaki – ōtsuzumi (on "Kogun")

== References / External Links ==
- RCA Victor Records RVC RCA-9115 ~ RCA-9116
- Allmusic
- 1977 Grammy nomination, Best Jazz Performance - Big Band (LA Times link)
