= Jazz Conversations =

Studio album by Toshiko Akiyoshi, Monday Michiru
- Released: July 2015
- Recorded: 6, 7 January 2015
- Venue: New York
- Genre: Jazz
- Label: Victor Entertainment
- Producers: Monday Michiru, Lew Tabackin

Monday Michiru chronology
Brasilified (2013)	Jazz Conversations (2015)

Toshiko Akiyoshi chronology
Classic Encounters (2010)	Jazz Conversations (2015)	Toshiko Akiyoshi Plays Gershwin's Porgy And Bess (2016)

Jazz Conversations, The Other Side of Monday Michiru is a 2015 recording by jazz pianist Toshiko Akiyoshi and her daughter singer/flutist Monday Michiru, released in Japan by Victor Entertainment.

== Track listing ==
1. "Long Yellow Road" (Akiyoshi, Michiru)
2. "First Night" (Akiyoshi)
3. "Love and Life" (Michiru)
4. "Warning: Success May Be Hazardous to Your Health" (Akiyoshi)
5. "New Girl in Town (Where Are We?)" (Michiru)
6. "Broken Dreams" (Tabackin, Michiru)
7. "Dreaming" (Michiru)
8. "Ain't Gonna Ask No More" (Akiyoshi, Michiru)
9. "Frog" (Michiru)
10. "One Note Samba" (Jobim, Mendonça)

== Personnel ==
- Toshiko Akiyoshi – piano
- Monday Michiru – vocals, flute
- Paul Gill – bass
- Mark Taylor – drums
