= Live at Newport '77 =

Live album by Toshiko Akiyoshi – Lew Tabackin Big Band
- Released: 1977
- Recorded: Newport Jazz Festival, New York, June 29, 1977
- Genre: Jazz
- Length: 49:00
- Label: Victor (Japan)
- Producer: Hiroshi Isaka

Toshiko Akiyoshi – Lew Tabackin Big Band chronology
March of the Tadpoles (1977)	Live at Newport '77 (1977)	Live at Newport II (1977)

Live at Newport '77 was the second live recording of the Toshiko Akiyoshi – Lew Tabackin Big Band and was followed by another release, Live at Newport II recorded on the same day. Both albums were recorded at the 1977 Newport Jazz Festival.

== Track listing ==
All arrangements by Toshiko Akiyoshi. All songs composed by Akiyoshi except "Yet Another Tear" (Tabackin).

LP side A

1. "Strive for Jive" – 8:22
2. "A-10-205932" – 14:32

LP side B

1. "Hangin' Loose" – 10:05
2. "Since Perry" / "Yet Another Tear" – 16:01

== Personnel ==
- Toshiko Akiyoshi – piano
- Lew Tabackin – tenor saxophone and flute
- Gary Herbig – tenor saxophone
- Gary Foster – alto saxophone
- Dick Spencer – alto saxophone
- Beverly Darke – baritone saxophone
- Steven Huffsteter – trumpet
- Bobby Shew – trumpet
- Mike Price – trumpet
- Richard Cooper – trumpet
- Bill Reichenbach Jr. – trombone
- Charlie Loper – trombone
- Rick Culver – trombone
- Phil Teele – bass trombone
- Don Baldwin – bass
- Peter Donald – drums
