= Gene Cherico =

American jazz musician

Eugene Valentino Cherico (April 15, 1935, Buffalo, New York – August 12, 1994, Santa Monica, California) was an American jazz double-bassist.

Cherico played drums as a child and played in a special services band in the Army, but injured his hand and picked up double bass as therapy. He attended the Berklee College of Music, where he met Toshiko Akiyoshi, with whom he would tour and record intermittently for many years. He also worked as a sideman with Herb Pomeroy (1957–59), Maynard Ferguson (1959–60), Red Norvo (1961), Benny Goodman (1962), George Shearing (1963), Stan Getz (1964–66), and Peter Nero (1966–70). He also recorded with Gary Burton and Joe Morello in 1961 and with Paul Desmond in 1961 and 1963.

Cherico spent much of the 1970s as a studio musician, working with Frank Strazzeri (1973, 1975), Louie Bellson, Lew Tabackin, Gerry Mulligan (1974), and Akiyoshi playing mostly bass guitar. He also did work as an accompanist to singers such as Peggy Lee (1966), Carmen McRae (1970), Frank Sinatra (1973-1982), and Nancy Wilson. He toured extensively with Sinatra into the next decade. He retired in 1984 after being diagnosed with Non-Hodgkin lymphoma.

== Discography ==
With Toshiko Akiyoshi

- Toshiko and Leon Sash at Newport (Verve, 1958)
- Long Yellow Road (Asahi, 1961)
- Live at Birdland (Fresh Sound, 1961)
- The Toshiko – Mariano Quartet with Charlie Mariano (Candid, 1961)
- Toshiko – Mariano Quartet (in West Side) with Charlie Mariano (Takt, 1963)
- Kogun (RCA, 1974)
- Long Yellow Road (RCA, 1975)
- The Many Sides of Toshiko (Verve, 1975)
- Dedications (Discomate, 1976)
- East and West with Charlie Mariano (RCA, 1977)
- Notorious Tourist from the East (Inner City, 1978)
- Toshiko Plays Toshiko (Discomate, 1979)
- Just Be Bop (Discomate, 1980)
- Toshiko Akiyoshi Trio (Eastworld, 1983)

With Paul Desmond

- Desmond Blue (RCA Victor, 1962)
- Take Ten (RCA Victor, 1963)
- Glad to Be Unhappy (RCA Victor, 1965)
- Easy Living (RCA Victor, 1966)
- Late Lament (RCA, 1974)

With Stan Getz

- Getz Au Go Go (Verve, 1964)
- Getz/Gilberto #2 (Verve, 1965)
- The Girl from Ipanema (Polydor, 1966)
- Stan Getz (Verve, 1987)
- Stan Getz & Friends (Verve, 1988)
- Joao & Astrud Gilberto Meet Stan Getz (The Entertainers 1988)
- Nobody Else But Me (Verve, 1994)
- Live at Newport 1964 (Solitude, 2014)
- Getz Plays Jobim: The Girl from Ipanema (Verve, 2002)
- Body and Soul (Verve/Universal, 2006)
- The Brilliant Canadian Concert of Stan Getz (Can-Am, 2008)

With Astrud Gilberto

- Brazilian Mood (Metro, 1977)
- Astrud Gilberto (Verve, 1987)
- The Astrud Gilberto Album (Jazz Door, 1991)
- Astrud Gilberto's Finest Hour (Verve, 2001)
- Astrud for Lovers (Verve, 2004)

With George Shearing

- Out of the Woods (Capitol, 1964)
- Rare Form! (Capitol, 1966)

With Frank Sinatra

- She Shot Me Down (Reprise, 1981)
- L.A. Is My Lady (Qwest, 1984)
- Sinatra: Vegas (Reprise, 2006)
- Sinatra: New York (Reprise, 2009)

With Frank Strazzeri

- Taurus (Revelation, 1973)
- Frames (Glendale, 1975)

With others

- Louie Bellson, Louie Rides Again! (Percussion Power, 1974)
- Roy Burns, Big, Bad & Beautiful (FPM, 1973)
- Gary Burton, New Vibe Man in Town (RCA Victor, 1962)
- Irving Cottler, I've Got You Under My Skins (Project 3, 1982)
- Maynard Ferguson, Maynard Ferguson Plays Jazz for Dancing (Roulette, 1986)
- Peter Nero, Nero: Fantasy and Improvisations, Gershwin: Concerto in F (RCA, 1968)
- Red Norvo, Vibes a La Red (Famous Door, 2003)
- Bill Perkins, Remembrance of Dino's (Interplay, 1989)
- Sylvia Syms, Syms by Sinatra (Reprise, 1982)
