= Eternal Best =

Greatest hits album by Toshiko Akiyoshi – Lew Tabackin Big Band
- Released: December 16, 1998
- Genre: Jazz
- Label: RCA/BMG Japan

Eternal Best (also known as Best 8) is a compilation album of songs taken from BMG Japan releases of the Toshiko Akiyoshi – Lew Tabackin Big Band and the Toshiko Akiyoshi Jazz Orchestra featuring Lew Tabackin.

== Track listing ==
All songs composed and arranged by Toshiko Akiyoshi:

1. "Long Yellow Road"
2. "First Night"
3. "Road Time Shuffle"
4. "Sumi-e"
5. "Salted Gingko Nuts"
6. "Pollination" (from the "Four Seasons of Morita Village" Suite)
7. "China Remembered (My Teacher, Mr. Yan)"
8. "Minamata Suite"
  1. "Peaceful Village"
  2. "Prosperity & Consequence"
  3. "Epilogue"
