= Toshiko Akiyoshi Solo Live at the Kennedy Center =

Live album by Toshiko Akiyoshi
- Released: 2000
- Recorded: April 2000
- Venue: Kennedy Center, Washington DC
- Genre: Jazz
- Label: Nippon Crown Records

Toshiko Akiyoshi chronology
| Sketches of Japan (1999) | Toshiko Akiyoshi Solo Live at the Kennedy Center (2000) | New York Sketch Book (2004) |

Toshiko Akiyoshi Solo Live at the Kennedy Center is a live solo album recorded by jazz pianist Toshiko Akiyoshi. It was recorded at the Kennedy Center in Washington DC and released in 2000 by Nippon Crown Records.

== Track listing ==
1. "Count Your Blessings Instead of Sheep"
2. "I Got It Bad And That Ain't So Good"
3. "Improvisation In Five"
4. "Un Poco Loco"
5. "Deep River"
6. "Con Alma"
7. "Village"
8. "Repose"
9. "Just One of Those Things"
10. "Ten Ten"
