= Jazz, the Personal Dimension =

Jazz, The Personal Dimension

Live album by Toshiko Akiyoshi
- Released: 1971
- Recorded: 5 February 1971
- Venue: Carnegie Recital Hall, New York City
- Genre: Jazz
- Label: Victor

Toshiko Akiyoshi chronology
In Japan / Long Yellow Road (1970)	Jazz, The Personal Dimension (1971)	Meditation (1971)

Jazz, The Personal Dimension is a jazz album recorded by the Toshiko Akiyoshi Quartet in New York City in early February 1971 and released by Victor (Japan) Records (Victor SPX-2).

== Track listing ==
Side 'A'

1. "The Village" (Akiyoshi)
2. "The Sea in Springtime" (Miyagi)

Side 'B'

1. "Lover Man" (Davis, Ramirez, Sherman)
2. "State of Being" (Akiyoshi)

== Personnel ==
- Toshiko Akiyoshi – piano
- Lew Tabackin – tenor saxophone, flute
- Lyn Christie – bass
- Bill Goodwin – drums

Personnel note: Although the promotional poster photographed for the album cover lists Bob Daugherty and Mickey Roker on bass and drums (respectively), the album liner notes credit Lyn Christie and Bill Goodwin.
