= Toshiko Akiyoshi Plays Gershwin's Porgy And Bess =

Toshiko Akiyoshi Plays Gershwin's "Porgy And Bess"

Studio album by Toshiko Akiyoshi
- Released: 4 January 2016
- Recorded: 20, 21 June 2015
- Studio: Avatar Studio, New York
- Genre: Jazz
- Label: Studio Songs

Toshiko Akiyoshi chronology
Jazz Conversations (2015)	Toshiko Akiyoshi Plays Gershwin's "Porgy And Bess" (2016)	My Long Yellow Road (2017)

Toshiko Akiyoshi Plays Gershwin's "Porgy and Bess" is a 2016 recording by jazz pianist Toshiko Akiyoshi.

== Track listing ==
1. "Summertime"
2. "I Got Plenty o' Nuttin'"
3. "I Loves You, Porgy"
4. "My Man's Gone Now"
5. "A Woman Is A Sometime Thing"
6. "It Ain't Necessarily So"
7. "Bess, You Is My Woman Now"
8. "Bess, O Where's My Bess"
9. "A Red-Haired Woman"

all music composed by George Gershwin

== Personnel ==
- Toshiko Akiyoshi – piano
- Paul Gill – bass (tracks 2, 8, 9)
- Yasushi Nakamura (中村 恭士) – bass (tracks 5, 6, 7)
- George Mraz – bass (tracks 3, 4)
- Mark Taylor – drums (tracks 4~8)
- Rodney Green – drums (tracks 2, 9)
