= Toshiko Akiyoshi Trio (1983 album) =

Studio album by Toshiko Akiyoshi
- Released: 1983
- Recorded: 27 May 1983
- Venue: Los Angeles
- Genre: Jazz
- Length: 36:48
- Label: Toshiba East World
- Producer: Toshiko Akiyoshi

Toshiko Akiyoshi chronology
Tuttie Flutie (1980)	Toshiko Akiyoshi Trio (1983)	Time Stream (1984)

Toshiko Akiyoshi Trio is a jazz trio album recorded by pianist Toshiko Akiyoshi in 1983. It was released on the Toshiba / EMI East World record label. This recording is not to be confused with the 1956 Storyville recording The Toshiko Trio.

== Track listing ==
LP side A

1. "Heartache" – 5:25
2. "Nancy" – 6:38
3. "Love is a Many Splendored Thing" – 5:50

LP side B

1. "Feast in Milano" – 6:32
2. "Come Sunday" – 4:08
3. "Hey There" – 8:15

== Personnel ==
- Toshiko Akiyoshi – piano
- Gene Cherico – bass
- Joey Baron – drums
