= Dedications II =

Dedications II (Toshiko Akiyoshi Trio)

Studio album by Toshiko Akiyoshi
- Released: 1977
- Recorded: 25, 26, 27 April 1977
- Venue: Hollywood, California
- Studio: Sage and Sound Recording Studio
- Genre: Jazz
- Length: 35:10
- Label: Discomate / Inner City
- Producer: Toshiko Akiyoshi

Toshiko Akiyoshi chronology
Dedications (1976)	Dedications II (Toshiko Akiyoshi Trio) (1977)	Toshiko Plays Billy Strayhorn (1978)

Alternative cover / title
- Inner City (US) LP cover

Alternative cover
- Alfa Records (Japan) CD cover

Professional ratings
Review scores
Source	Rating
Allmusic link	4/5 stars

The jazz album Dedications II was recorded by two configurations of the Toshiko Akiyoshi Trio in Los Angeles in April 1977. It was released by Discomate Records (and later by Alfa Records) in Japan and by Inner City Records (as simply Dedications) in the USA.

== Track listing ==
LP side A

1. "Swingin' till the Girls Come Home" (Pettiford) – 6:17
2. "Israel" (Carisi) – 5:05
3. "Solar" (Davis) – 5:21

LP side B

1. "Two Bass Hit" (Lewis, Gillespie) – 3:10
2. "Enigma" (Johnson) – 4:58
3. "In Your Own Sweet Way" (Brubeck) – 5:19
4. "Tempus Fugit" (Powell) – 5:00

== Personnel ==
Tracks A1, 3, B2, 4:

- Toshiko Akiyoshi – piano
- Jimmie Smith – drums
- Bob Daugherty – bass

Tracks A2, B1, 3:

- Toshiko Akiyoshi – piano
- Peter Donald – drums
- Andy Simpkins – bass

== References / external links ==
- Discomate DSP-5006
- Inner City 6046
- Alfa Records (Japan) ALCR-162
- Allmusic
