= Dig (Toshiko Akiyoshi album) =

Studio album by Toshiko Akiyoshi
- Released: 1993
- Recorded: 1993 March
- Genre: Jazz
- Length: 48:54
- Label: Nippon Crown

Toshiko Akiyoshi chronology
Chic Lady (1991)	Dig (1993)	Toshiko Akiyoshi at Maybeck (1994)

Professional ratings
Review scores
Source	Rating
Allmusic	4/5 stars

Dig is a small combo jazz album recorded by Toshiko Akiyoshi in 1993 and released on the Nippon Crown record label.

== Track listing ==
1. "Dig" (Davis) – 7:58
2. "Lament" (Johnson) – 7:10
3. "Lazy Days" (Akiyoshi) – 7:04
4. "Harlequin Tears" (Akiyoshi) – 6:46
5. "Uptown Stroll" (Akiyoshi) – 6:31
6. "Morning Of The Carnival" (Bonfá, Maria) – 7:46
7. "Mucura" (trad.) – 5:39

== Personnel ==
- Toshiko Akiyoshi – piano
- Conte Candoli – trumpet
- Walt Weiskopf – tenor saxophone
- Peter Washington – bass
- Kenny Washington – drums
