= Classic Encounters =

Studio album by Toshiko Akiyoshi, Reiko Honshoh
- Released: 6 October 2010
- Recorded: 30, 31 May 2010 Tokyo (tracks 2, 3, 5-8) and 27 June 2010, New York (tracks 1, 4)
- Label: Studio Songs (Japan)

Toshiko Akiyoshi chronology
Solo Live 2004 (2009)	Classic Encounters (2010)	Jazz Conversations (2015)

Classic Encounters is a 2010 recording by jazz pianist Toshiko Akiyoshi with Reiko Honshoh.

== Track listing ==
1. "Toshiko's March" – "Alla Turca: Allegretto in A minor" / Piano Sonata No. 11 (Mozart)
2. "2 Part Invention" – Inventions and Sinfonias, No. 4 in D Minor (Bach)
3. "Nocturnes, Op. 9, Nr. 2 (Chopin)
4. "Joking with Beethoven" – "Piano Sonata Nr. 23" (Beethoven)
5. "Arab Dance" – The Nutcracker (Tchaikovsky)
6. "Solveig's Song" – Peer Gynt (Grieg)
7. "The Dance of Genji Ladies" – "Pavane" (Fauré)
8. "Put on the Costume" a.k.a. "On with the Motley" (Leoncavallo)

== Personnel ==
- Toshiko Akiyoshi – piano
- Reiko Honshoh – piano
