= Toshiko Plays Billy Strayhorn =

Studio album by Toshiko Akiyoshi
- Released: 1978
- Recorded: 3, 4, 5 April 1978
- Venue: Hollywood, CA
- Studio: Sage and Sound Recording Studio
- Genre: Jazz
- Length: 37:26
- Label: Discomate / JAM
- Producer: Toshiko Akiyoshi

Toshiko Akiyoshi chronology
Dedications II (1977)	Toshiko Plays Billy Strayhorn (1978)	Finesse (1978)

Alternative cover / title
- JAM Records (US) LP cover

Alternative cover / title
- Alfa Records (Japan) CD cover

Professional ratings
Review scores
Source	Rating
Allmusic link	4.5/5 stars

Toshiko Plays Billy Strayhorn (also released as A Tribute to Billy Strayhorn (JAM) and Dedications III (Alfa)) is a jazz album recorded by two different configurations of the Toshiko Akiyoshi Trio in 1978. It was released on the Discomate record label (and later by Alfa Records) in Japan and on the JAM Record label in the USA.

== Track listing ==
All songs composed by Billy Strayhorn except "Day Dream," composed by Strayhorn and Duke Ellington:

LP side A

1. "Take the "A" Train" – 4:53
2. "Day Dream" – 2:59
3. "Rain Check" – 5:28
4. "Lotus Blossom" – 3:54

LP side B

1. "Charpoy" – 5:22
2. "Lush Life" – 3:52
3. "Chelsea Bridge (song)" – 4:32
4. "Intimacy of the Blues" – 6:26

== Personnel ==
- Toshiko Akiyoshi – piano

All tracks except A3, B4:

- Peter Donald – drums
- John Heard – bass

Tracks A3, B4:

- Jeff Hamilton – drums
- Bob Daugherty – bass

== References / External links ==
- Discomate DSP-5011
- JAM Records (USA) JAM 5003
- Alfa Records (Japan) ALCR-163
- Allmusic
