= 50th Anniversary Concert in Japan =

Live album by Toshiko Akiyoshi
- Released: 1 November 2006
- Recorded: 6 March 2006
- Venue: Asahi Hall, Yūrakuchō, Tokyo
- Genre: Jazz
- Label: T-toc Records

Toshiko Akiyoshi chronology
Hope (2005)	50th Anniversary Concert in Japan (2006)	Let Freedom Swing (2008)

50th Anniversary Concert in Japan (Japanese title, 渡米50周年記念日本公演 = American visit 50th anniversary commemorative Japanese performance) is a live concert album recorded by jazz pianist Toshiko Akiyoshi and released in Japan on the T-toc Record label. The concert commemorated 50 years since Akiyoshi left Japan to study and play jazz in the US and the album received several Japanese music awards including a "special award" for Japanese Jazz from Swing Journal magazine.

== Track listing ==
All compositions by Toshiko Akiyoshi except as noted:

1. "Long Yellow Road"
2. "Kogun"
3. "Farewell To Mingus"
4. "The Village" ~ "Lady Liberty"
5. "Trinkle Tinkle" (T. Monk)
6. "Sumie"
7. "Chasing After Love"

== Personnel ==
- Toshiko Akiyoshi – piano
- Lew Tabackin – tenor saxophone, flute
- George Mraz – bass
- Lewis Nash – drums

== References / External Links / Awards ==
- T-toc Records TTOC-0006
- 2006 Swing Journal Japan Jazz special award (Japanese link)
