= Finesse (Toshiko Akiyoshi album) =

Studio album by Toshiko Akiyoshi
- Released: 1978
- Recorded: 8 May 1978
- Venue: Los Angeles
- Genre: Jazz
- Length: 43:45
- Label: Concord

Toshiko Akiyoshi chronology
Toshiko Plays Billy Strayhorn (1978)	Finesse (1978)	Notorious Tourist from the East (1978)

Professional ratings
Review scores
Source	Rating
AllMusic	3.5/5 stars
The Penguin Guide to Jazz	2/4 stars
The Rolling Stone Jazz Record Guide	3/5 stars

Finesse is a jazz trio album recorded by pianist Toshiko Akiyoshi in 1978 and released on the Concord Jazz record label.

== Track listing ==
LP side A

1. "Count Your Blessings (Instead of Sheep)" (Berlin) – 5:03
2. "American Ballad" (Akiyoshi) – 5:50
3. "Love Letters" (Heyman, Young) – 5:10
4. "Wouldn't It Be Loverly?" (Lerner, Loewe) – 5:34

LP side B

1. "Mr. Jelly Lord" (Morton) – 6:06
2. "Warning! Success May Be Hazardous to Your Health" (Akiyoshi) – 3:21
3. "You Go to My Head" (Coots, Gillespie) – 5:53
4. "Solvejg's Song" (Grieg) – 6:48

== Personnel ==
- Toshiko Akiyoshi – piano
- Jake Hanna – drums
- Monty Budwig – bass
