= New York Sketch Book =

Studio album by Toshiko Akiyoshi
- Released: 10 April 2004
- Recorded: 14, 15, 16 August 2003
- Studio: Avatar Recording Studio, New York City
- Genre: Jazz
- Length: 50:29
- Label: Nippon Crown
- Producer: Toshiko Akiyoshi, Tetsuya Iwasaki

Toshiko Akiyoshi chronology
Solo Live at the Kennedy Center (2000)	New York Sketch Book (2004)	Hope (2005)

New York Sketch Book is a piano trio album recorded by jazz pianist Toshiko Akiyoshi. It was recorded in New York and released by Nippon Crown Records in 2004.

== Track listing ==
1. "Five Spot After Dark" – 4:29
2. "52nd Street Theme" – 4:56
3. "Skating in Central Park" – 7:52
4. "Uptown Stroll" – 5:45
5. "Drop Me Off in Harlem" – 7:01
6. "New York State of Mind" – 5:09
7. "Central Park West" – 5:13
8. "Lady Liberty" – 5:33
9. "Take Me Out to the Ball Game" – 4:31

== Personnel ==
- Toshiko Akiyoshi – piano
- Kenny Washington – drums
- Peter Washington – bass

== References / external links ==
- Nippon Crown Records CRCJ-9159
