= Notorious Tourist from the East =

Studio album by Toshiko Akiyoshi
- Released: 1979
- Recorded: 5, 6 December 1978
- Venue: Los Angeles
- Genre: Jazz
- Label: Inner City / Discomate

Toshiko Akiyoshi chronology
Finesse (1978)	Notorious Tourist from the East (1979)	Just Be Bop (1980)

Alternative cover / title
- Discomate (Japan) release cover

Professional ratings
Review scores
Source	Rating
Allmusic link	4/5 stars
The Rolling Stone Jazz Record Guide	3/5 stars

The jazz album Notorious Tourist from the East was recorded by Toshiko Akiyoshi in 1978 and released in the USA on the Inner City Record label and in Japan on the Discomate record label (as Toshiko Plays Toshiko, not to be confused with the 1996 Nippon Crown recording, Time Stream: Toshiko Plays Toshiko).

== Track listing ==
Side 'A'

1. "Notorious Tourist from the East"
2. "Soliloquy"

Side 'B'

1. "Hangin' Loose"
2. "Memory"
3. "After Mr. Teng"

All songs composed by Toshiko Akiyoshi

== Personnel ==
- Toshiko Akiyoshi – piano
- Steven Huffsteter – trumpet
- Gene Cherico – bass
- Billy Higgins – drums
