= Salted Gingko Nuts =

Studio album by Toshiko Akiyoshi – Lew Tabackin Big Band
- Released: 1978
- Recorded: Devonshire Recording Studio, Los Angeles, California, November 15–16, 1978
- Genre: Jazz
- Length: 41:06
- Label: Victor (Japan) / Baystate Records
- Producer: Hiroshi Isaka

Toshiko Akiyoshi – Lew Tabackin Big Band chronology
Live at Newport II (1977)	Salted Gingko Nuts (1978)	Sumi-e (1979)

Alternative cover
- Ascent LP album cover

Professional ratings
Review scores
Source	Rating
Allmusic	4.5/5 stars
The Rolling Stone Jazz Record Guide	4/5 stars

Salted Gingko Nuts [sic], also known by its Japanese title SHIO GIN NAN (塩銀杏 = salted ginkgo nuts), is the sixth studio album by the Toshiko Akiyoshi – Lew Tabackin Big Band. Released in 1978, the album received the 1979 Silver Disk award from Japan's Swing Journal magazine.

== Track listing ==
All songs are composed by Toshiko Akiyoshi.

Side one
No.	Title	Length
1.	"Elusive Dream"	7:37
2.	"Lazy Day"	6:23
3.	"Chasing After Love"	6:55
Total length:		20:55

Side two
No.	Title	Length
1.	"Salted Gingko Nuts"	6:58
2.	"Time Stream"	7:00
3.	"Son of Road Time"	6:13
Total length:		20:11

== Personnel ==
- Toshiko Akiyoshi – piano
- Lew Tabackin – tenor saxophone and flute
- Tom Peterson – tenor saxophone
- Gary Foster – alto saxophone
- Dick Spencer – alto saxophone
- Bill Byrne – baritone saxophone
- Steven Huffsteter – trumpet
- Bobby Shew – trumpet
- Mike Price – trumpet
- Larry Ford – trumpet
- Bill Reichenbach Jr. – trombone
- Randy Aldcroft – trombone
- Rick Culver – trombone
- Phil Teele – bass trombone
- Mike Richmond – bass
- Peter Donald – drums
