= Let Freedom Swing =

Studio album by SWR Big Band, Toshiko Akiyoshi
- Released: February 2008
- Recorded: 9–12 May 2007,
- Studio: SWR U-Musik-Studio, Villa Berg, Stuttgart
- Genre: Jazz
- Length: 1:44:39
- Label: Hänssler Verlag (Germany)

Toshiko Akiyoshi chronology
50th Anniversary Concert in Japan (2006)	Let Freedom Swing (2008)	Vintage... (2008)

SWR Big Band chronology
Voyage, Don Menza and the SWR Big Band (2007)	Let Freedom Swing (2008)	Bald gras’ ich am Neckar (2009)

Let Freedom Swing is a big band jazz album recorded by the SWR Big Band with Toshiko Akiyoshi as guest pianist/conductor. The album was released as a 2 disk CD in February 2008 by Hänssler Verlag in Germany and includes performances of 12 Akiyoshi compositions.

== Track listing ==
All songs composed and arranged by Toshiko Akiyoshi:

1. "Drum Conference" (3rd movement) – 13:28
2. "Repose" – 5:16
3. "Harlequin's Tear" – 7:16
4. "Kogun" – 8:10
5. "Feast in Milano" – 8:15
6. "Let Freedom Swing" – 9:42
7. "Lady Liberty" – 7:24
8. "Pollination" – 13:08
9. "I Know Who Loves You" – 5:48
10. "Warning! Success May Be Hazardous to Your Health" – 5:48
11. "Song For The Harvest" – 7:24
12. "Epilogue: Hope" – 4:50
13. "Harlequin's Tear" (live bonus track) – 7:35

== Personnel ==
- Toshiko Akiyoshi – piano
- Decebal Badila – bass
- Holger Nell – drums
- Farouk Gomati – percussion
- Klaus Graf – alto saxophone, flute, clarinet, soprano saxophone
- Axel Kühn – alto saxophone, flute, soprano saxophone
- Andreas Maile – tenor saxophone, flute, clarinet, soprano saxophone
- Jörg Kaufmann – tenor saxophone, flute, piccolo flute
- Pierre Paquette – baritone saxophone, bass clarinet
- Karl Farrent – trumpet
- Claus Reichstaller – trumpet
- Frank Wellert – trumpet
- Felice Civitareale – trumpet
- Rudolf Reindl – trumpet
- Marc Godfroid – trombone
- Ian Cumming – trombone
- Ernst Hutter – trombone
- Georg Maus – trombone
- Dagmar Claus – speaker (on track 6, Let Freedom Swing)
