= Farewell (Toshiko Akiyoshi – Lew Tabackin Big Band album) =

Studio album by Toshiko Akiyoshi – Lew Tabackin Big Band
- Released: 1980
- Recorded: Devonshire Recording Studio, Los Angeles, California, January 10–11, 1980
- Genre: Jazz
- Length: 40:41
- Label: Victor (Japan) / Ascent
- Producer: Toshiko Akiyoshi and Lew Tabackin

Toshiko Akiyoshi – Lew Tabackin Big Band chronology
Sumi-e (1979)	Farewell (1980)	From Toshiko with Love (1981)

Professional ratings
Review scores
Source	Rating
AllMusic	4.5/5 stars
The Rolling Stone Jazz Record Guide	3/5 stars

Farewell is the eighth studio recording released by the Toshiko Akiyoshi – Lew Tabackin Big Band. The album received a 1980 Grammy Award nomination for "Best Jazz Instrumental Performance - Big Band."

== Track listing ==
All songs composed and arranged by Toshiko Akiyoshi:

LP side A

1. "After Mr. Teng" – 8:46
2. "Song for the Harvest" – 6:47
3. "Shades of Yellow" – 6:09

LP side B

1. "Autumn Sea" – 8:46
2. "Farewell (to Mingus)" – 10:13

== Personnel ==
- Toshiko Akiyoshi – piano
- Lew Tabackin – tenor saxophone and flute
- John Gross – tenor saxophone
- Dan Higgins – alto saxophone
- Gary Foster – alto saxophone
- Bill Byrne – baritone saxophone
- Buddy Childers – trumpet
- Steven Huffsteter – trumpet
- Larry Ford – trumpet
- Mike Price – trumpet
- Rick Culver – trombone
- Hart Smith – trombone
- Bruce Fowler – trombone
- Phil Teele – bass trombone
- Bob Bowman – bass
- Steve Haughton – drums

== References / External Links ==
- RCA Victor (Japan) Records RVC RVJ-6078
- Ascent Records ASC 1000
- 23rd Grammy Awards (1980) - list of nominees at india-server.com
