= Jazz Is My Native Language =

- Directed by: Renee Cho
- Produced by: Renee Cho
- Starring: Toshiko Akiyoshi
- Distributed by: Rhapsody Films, Inc
- Release date: 1983
- Running time: 58 minutes
- Country: United States
- Language: English

Jazz is my Native Language: A Portrait of Toshiko Akiyoshi is a 1983 documentary film by Renee Cho about the jazz pianist, composer, arranger and big band leader Toshiko Akiyoshi.
