= Kogun =

Studio album by Toshiko Akiyoshi – Lew Tabackin Big Band
- Released: August 1974
- Recorded: Sage & Sand Studio Hollywood, California, 3–4 April 1974
- Genre: Jazz
- Length: 41:23
- Label: Victor (Japan), RCA Victor (U.S.)
- Producer: Toshiko Akiyoshi and Hiroshi Isaka

Toshiko Akiyoshi – Lew Tabackin Big Band chronology
Kogun (1974)	Long Yellow Road (1975)

Alternative cover
- RCA (U.S.) LP cover

Professional ratings
Review scores
Source	Rating
Allmusic	4/5 stars

Kogun (Japanese: 孤軍) is the first album recorded by the Los Angeles-based Toshiko Akiyoshi – Lew Tabackin Big Band. It was released in Japan by Victor in 1974 and received the Swing Journal Silver Disk prize for that year. It was later released on RCA Victor in the USA and elsewhere and received a 1979 Grammy nomination for Best Jazz Instrumental Performance by a Big Band.

All tracks from this album are also included on the 2008 Mosaic 3 CD compilation, Mosaic Select: Toshiko Akiyoshi – Lew Tabackin Big Band.

== Track listing ==
All songs composed and arranged by Toshiko Akiyoshi

LP side A

1. "Elegy" – 9:13
2. "Memory" – 10:24

LP side B

1. "Kogun" – 6:49
2. "American Ballad" – 5:49
3. "Henpecked Old Man" – 9:08

== Personnel ==
- Toshiko Akiyoshi – piano
- Lew Tabackin – tenor saxophone
- Tom Peterson – tenor saxophone
- Dick Spencer – alto saxophone
- Gary Foster – alto saxophone
- Bill Perkins – baritone saxophone
- Bobby Shew – trumpet
- John Madrid – trumpet
- Don Rader – trumpet
- Mike Price – trumpet
- Charles Loper – trombone
- Jim Sawyer – trombone
- Britt Woodman – trombone
- Phil Teele – bass trombone
- Gene Cherico – bass
- Peter Donald – drums

Other

- Scott Ellsworth – voice (on "Memory")
