= Toshiko Akiyoshi in Japan =

Live album by Toshiko Akiyoshi
- Released: 1970
- Recorded: 18, 19 August 1970
- Venue: Osaka Expo Hall, Osaka, Japan
- Genre: Jazz
- Length: 38:37
- Label: Toshiba

Toshiko Akiyoshi chronology
Toshiko at Top of the Gate (1968)	Toshiko Akiyoshi in Japan (1970)	Jazz, The Personal Dimension (1971)

Alternative cover
- alternate album cover

Toshiko Akiyoshi in Japan (also released as Long Yellow Road, Toshiko Akiyoshi Quartet) is an album by pianist Toshiko Akiyoshi, recorded at the Osaka Expo Hall in Osaka, Japan in 1970 and released by Toshiba Records. It is not to be confused with other similarly titled releases by the Toshiko Akiyoshi Trio and the Toshiko Akiyoshi - Lew Tabackin Big Band.

== Track listing ==
LP side A

1. "Opus No. Zero" (Akiyoshi) – 8:33
2. "Sweet and Lovely" (Arnheim) – 12:56

LP side B

1. "Long Yellow Road" (Akiyoshi) – 17:48

== Personnel ==
- Toshiko Akiyoshi – piano
- Lew Tabackin – tenor saxophone, flute
- Bob Daugherty – bass
- Mickey Roker – drums

== References / external links ==
discogs.com

- Express – TOCT-9361
- Far East – ETJ-65009

Toshiba LPC-8049
Toshiba / EMI CA32-1440
