= Ōtsuzumi =

Musical instrument

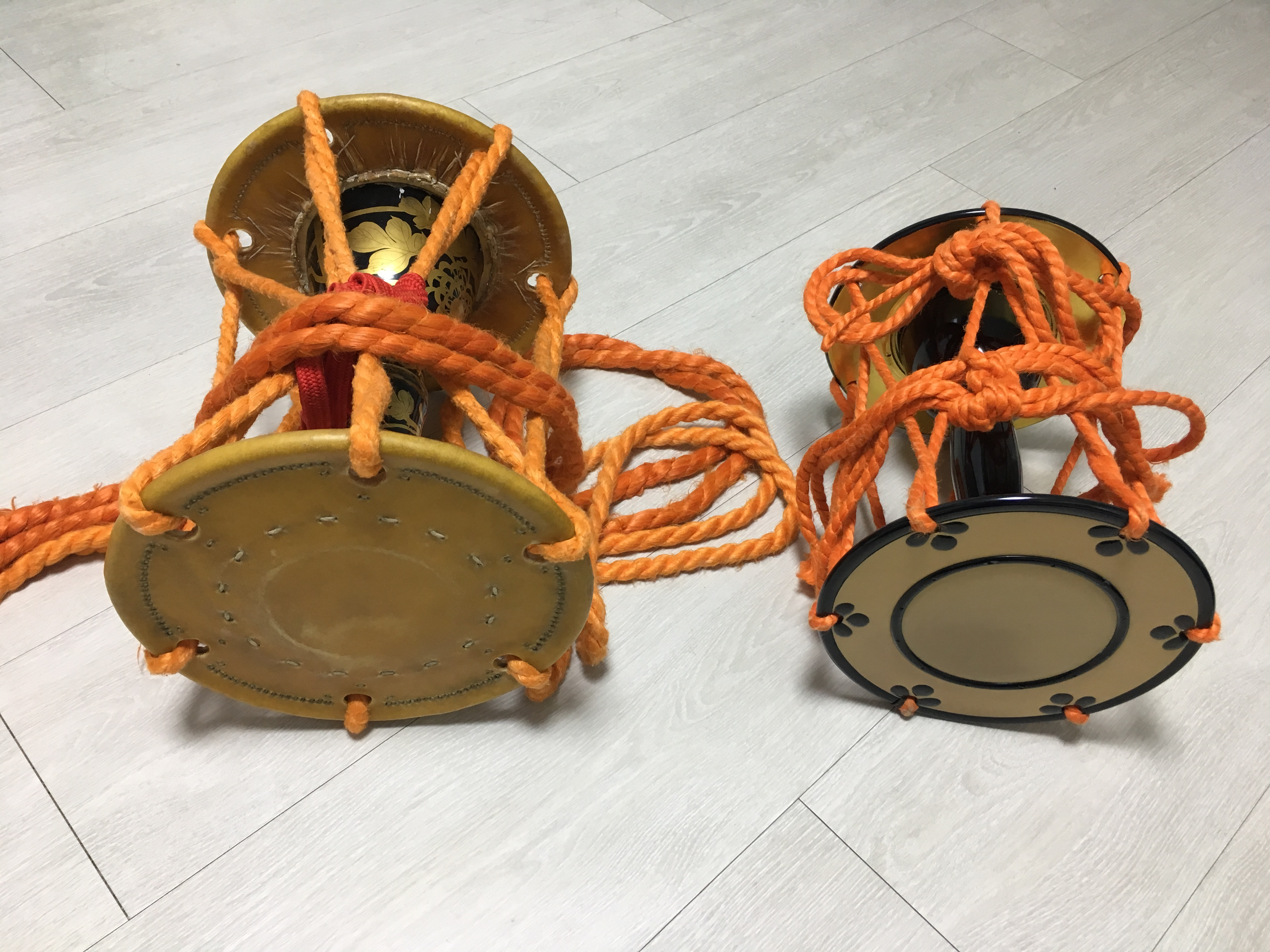
An ōtsuzumi (left) compared to a kotsuzumi (right)

The ōtsuzumi (大鼓), also known as the ōkawa (大皮), is an hourglass-shaped Japanese drum. It is a larger version of the tsuzumi, or kotsuzumi, and is used in traditional Japanese theater and folk music. Its appearance is slightly different from that of the tsuzumi, and the sound produced is vastly different from any of the four sounds the kotsuzumi produces. Whereas the kotsuzumi is smaller and has a more ornate drum head, the ōkawa is larger, and its head takes on a more plain, leathery appearance. The sound is also higher and sharper in pitch, resembling more of a dry, almost metallic "crack" than the tsuzumi's softer "pon" sound. The hourglass structure is slightly bigger, and has a prominent protruding "knob" at the middle, unlike that of the kotsuzumi, which has a smoothened-out middle section. The heads of the drum are taut very tightly, leaving no room for further tension, and acoustic, adjustments. The ōkawa is played on the left thigh of the player, possibly due to its larger, heavy size, whereas the tsuzumi is played upon the right shoulder.

The drum heads are made of thick, stiff horsehide taken from grown horses, and care for the drum heads of the ōkawa is peculiar in that they must be kept dry at all times. In contrast, the heads of the smaller kotsuzumi must always be moist. Since the sound of the ōkawa is supposed to be higher in pitch, the player must ensure that the skin of the drum-heads remains as constricted as possible, and this is best realized when the drum heads are kept dry. To keep the drum heads dry, they are often heated near a kind of old style of Japanese furnace called a hibachi no less than an hour before the performance. When ready to perform, the player takes the drumheads and binds them to the body of the ōkawa as tightly as possible using a thick, heavy duty hemp rope, and uses a type of thinner silk rope to further constrict the rope binding the drumheads and to provide grip for the player, before finishing the preparation by draping an ornamental hemp rope with long tassels onto the drum. Given the nature of the heads of the ōkawa, they wear after a specific number of times. Since they are very expensive, at least a thousand US dollars a pair, the ōkawa player must measure how many times, and how long, the instrument is played. If the heads are taken good care of, they can be used for as much as ten performances, after which the heads show signs of wear, lose their desired sound quality, and must be discarded.

Like the tsuzumi, the ōkawa is also struck with a player's bare hands. As the drum heads are taut very tightly, it often hurts to play the drum, and calluses must be developed on the player's fingers to play comfortably. The calluses must be taken care of, being shaved with a knife from time to time before they get too big. Most players use deerhide padding on the palm of their hand, to protect their palm and enhance the sound. They also wear fingerstalls made of multiple layers of Japanese washi paper, hardened with starch, on their fingers.
