= Long Yellow Road (Toshiko Akiyoshi – Lew Tabackin Big Band album) =

Studio album by Toshiko Akiyoshi – Lew Tabackin Big Band
- Released: 1975
- Recorded: April 4, 1974 – March 4, 1975
- Studio: Sage & Sound Studio, Hollywood, California
- Genre: Jazz
- Length: 42:30
- Label: Victor (Japan), RCA Victor (U.S.)
- Producer: Hiroshi Isaka

Toshiko Akiyoshi – Lew Tabackin Big Band chronology
Kogun (1974)	Long Yellow Road (1975)	Tales of a Courtesan (Oirantan) (1976)

Alternative cover
- RCA Victor (U.S.) LP cover

Professional ratings
Review scores
Source	Rating
Allmusic	4.5/5 stars
The Rolling Stone Jazz Record Guide	5/5 stars

Long Yellow Road is the second album by the Toshiko Akiyoshi – Lew Tabackin Big Band. It was named Best Jazz Album of the year by Stereo Review magazine. In 1976, the album received a Grammy Award nomination for Best Jazz Performance by a Big Band.

"Long Yellow Road" is the title of two other albums by the Toshiko Akiyoshi Trio (1961) and the Toshiko Akiyoshi Quartet (1970).

== Track listing ==
All music is composed by Toshiko Akiyoshi except where noted.

Side A
No.	Title	Length
1.	"Long Yellow Road"	6:30
2.	"The First Night""	4:58
3.	"Opus No. Zero"	10:10

Side B
No.	Title	Length
4.	"Quadrille, Anyone"	6:25
5.	"Children in the Temple Ground"	5:32
6.	"Since Perry/Yet Another Tear" (Lew Tabackin)	8:55

== Personnel ==
- Toshiko Akiyoshi – piano
- Lew Tabackin – tenor saxophone, flute, piccolo
- Stu Blumberg – trumpet (on "The First Night", Opus No. Zero" and "Children in the Temple Ground")
- John Madrid – trumpet (on "Long Yellow Road")
- Lynn Nicholson – trumpet (on "Quadrille Anyone?" and "Since Perry/Yet Another Tear")
- Mike Price – trumpet
- Don Rader – trumpet
- Bobby Shew – trumpet
- Charlie Loper – trombone
- Bruce Paulson – trombone (except on "Long Yellow Road")
- Jim Sawyer – trombone (on "Long Yellow Road")
- Phil Teele – bass trombone
- Britt Woodman – trombone
- Dick Spencer – alto saxophone, flute, clarinet
- Gary Foster – alto saxophone, soprano saxophone, flute, clarinet (except on "Opus No. Zero")
- Joe Roccisano – alto saxophone (on "Opus No. Zero")
- Tom Peterson – tenor saxophone, alto flute, clarinet
- Bill Perkins – baritone saxophone, alto flute, bass clarinet
- Gene Cherico – bass
- Peter Donald – drums (except on "Opus No. Zero" and "Since Perry/Yet Another Tear")
- Chuck Flores – drums (on "Opus No. Zero" and "Since Perry/Yet Another Tear")
- Tokuko Kaga – vocal (on "Children in the Temple Ground")
