= Tsuzumi =

Musical instrument

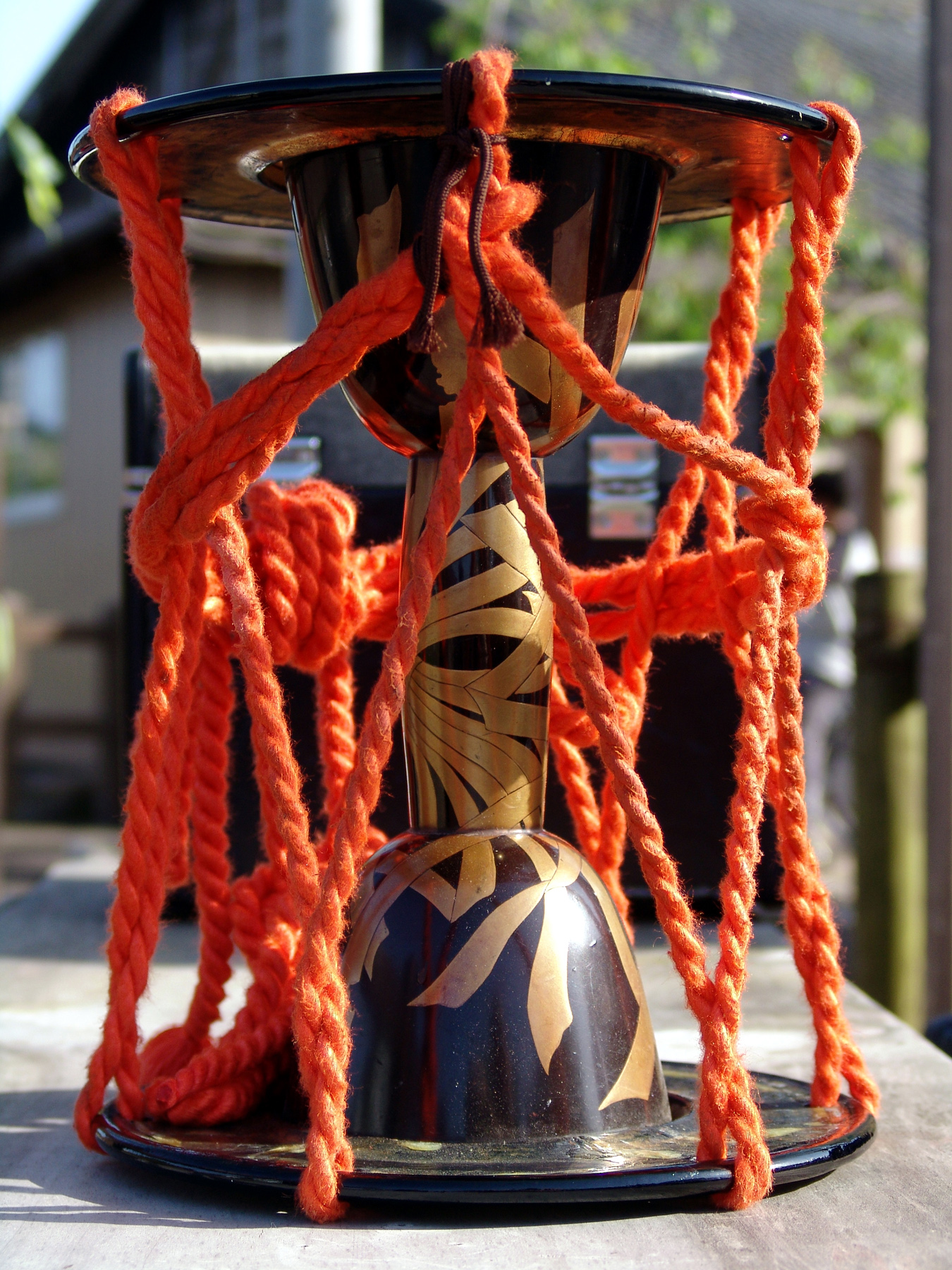
A tsuzumi drum

A tsuzumi being demonstrated.

The tsudzumi (鼓) or tsuzumi is a hand drum of Japanese origin. It consists of a wooden body shaped like an hourglass, and it is taut, with two drum heads with cords that can be squeezed or released to increase or decrease the tension of the heads respectively. This mechanism allows the player to raise or lower the pitch of the drum while playing, not unlike the African talking drum and the Indian dhadd.

== History ==
The predecessor to the tsuzumi, the yōko (腰鼓, hip drum), was brought to Japan from southern China in the 7th century as part of the gigaku ensemble. There were four types of yōko, of which only the ikko (壱鼓) and the san-no-tsudzumi (三ノ鼓) survive. Like the modern tsuzumi, the yōko's membrane was fastened to a hemp cord called the shirabeo (調べ緒). Unlike the contemporary instrument, the yōko was suspended from the performer's neck. The drumhead was hit with a mallet held in the right hand and the palm of the left hand.

In the twelfth century, the performance of the ikko, the smallest of the yōko varieties, changed, where players would strike one face with the right hand and manipulate the pitch with the left hand. It was around this time that the name of the ikko changed to the kotsuzumi (小鼓; also called shōko).

The tsuzumi was first used by the Shirabyōshi, eventually becoming the primary instrument of the hayashi section in Noh and later in kabuki.

== Performance ==
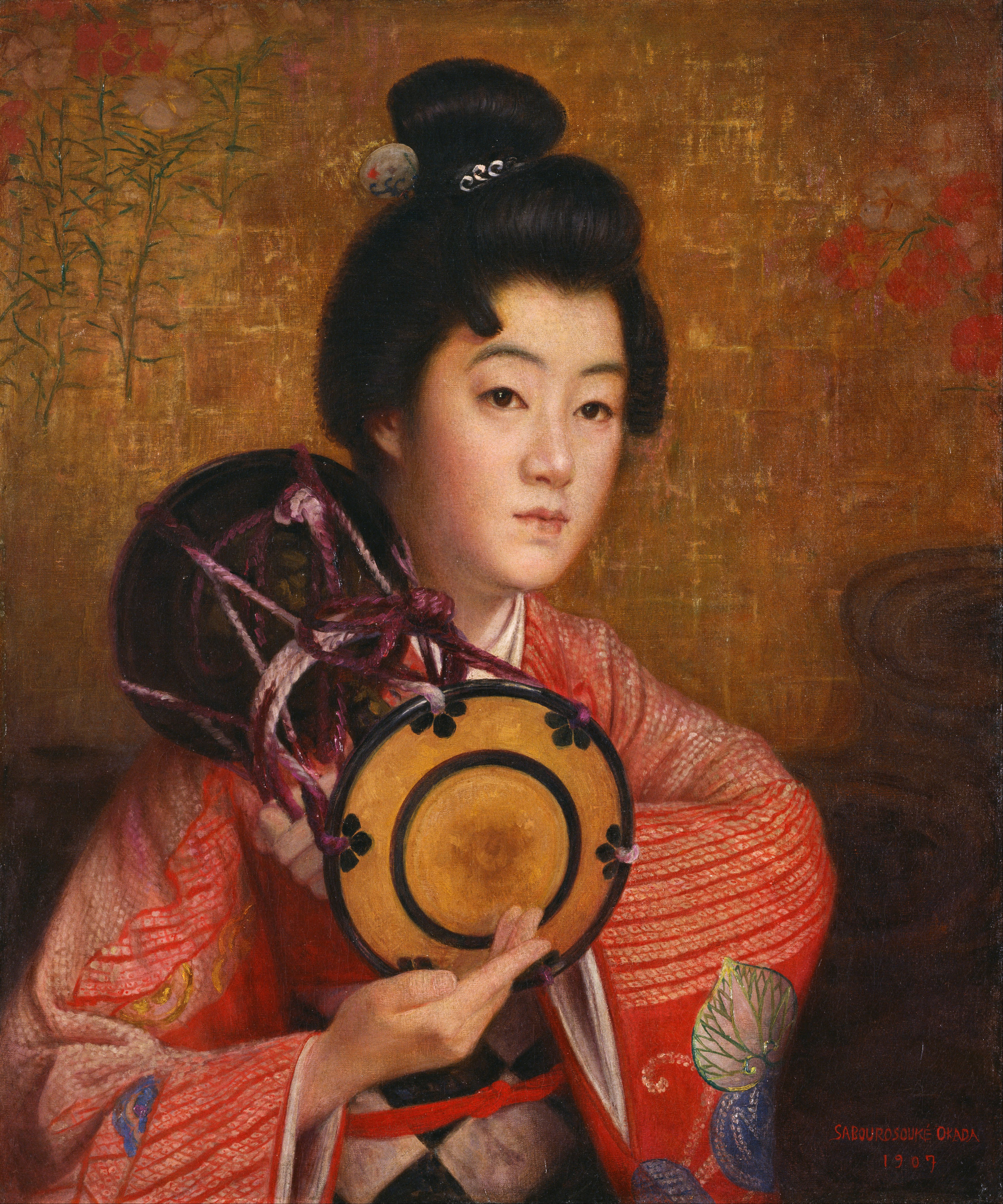
Okada Saburosuke, "Portrait of a Lady"

There are two basic techniques when playing a tsuzumi; holding the cords slack and hitting the drumhead on the very center, or squeezing the cords and hitting the drumhead closer to where it meets the wooden body. The former produces softer pon and pu sounds, whereas the latter produces higher-pitched ta and chi sounds. Because the practice of hitting a drumhead on the very center may result in hindering the sound by causing vibration radiating on two opposite sides of the drumhead to cancel out with each other, the tsuzumi is tuned with tiny leather patches applied on the inside of the heads, much like the larger shime-daiko that accompany the tsuzumi in Noh and Kabuki theaters. It is also notable that the tsuzumi, being a more delicate instrument compared to the shime-daiko, is further fine-tuned on-site depending on ambient temperature and humidity using pieces of washi paper moistened with the player's own saliva.

Care for this instrument is peculiar in that the drum heads must be exposed to a certain level of moisture to produce a desirable sound. Before playing the tsuzumi, the player will breathe directly onto both heads. Sometimes he will even take some saliva and apply it to the head of the drum. The quality of sound of the drum will depend on how much moisture is in the atmosphere where it is being played. To make sure the drum heads are moist, the player will breathe into the drum head at intervals when not playing. However, if the heads become excessively moist, they may become too slack to be played properly, and may develop noticeable ripples on the surface, further compromising the sound quality.

== Construction ==
Each drumhead is crafted with a piece of foal skin sewn onto an iron ring. Then a thick layer of reinforcement is added on the back, and finished with urushi lacquer and gold leaves. The sew marks are also covered up with urushi lacquer, which provides both decoration and further reinforcement to the drumhead. In contrast, the drumheads used for the ōtsuzumi are made of thick horsehide, and are never decorated, as they are meant to be consumables. The wooden body is carved out from a single block of cherry wood, and is decorated with urushi lacquer and gold leaves in the maki-e style. The bodies are 25 centimeters in length. The hemp cords were dyed previously in vermillion, although other dyes are used today due to its toxicity.

Thanks to the meticulous measures gone through to craft them, a set of drumheads combined with the wooden body, when properly cared for, is said to last for centuries; it is not uncommon for professional players to use instruments made in the Edo period or Muromachi period. New instruments on the other hand might require years, or even decades, of use to be broken in. Only the cords holding the instrument need to be regularly replaced as they fray over time.

The tsuzumi plays roles in both Noh and kabuki theater music, but it is also used in min'yō (民謡), or Japanese folk music. It is often played with its bigger counterpart, the ōtsuzumi (大鼓, large tsuzumi), also called ōkawa (大皮; lit. "large skin").

The East entrance gate at JR Kanazawa Station was built to look like a tsuzumi.
