= Lew Tabackin =

American jazz saxophonist and flutist

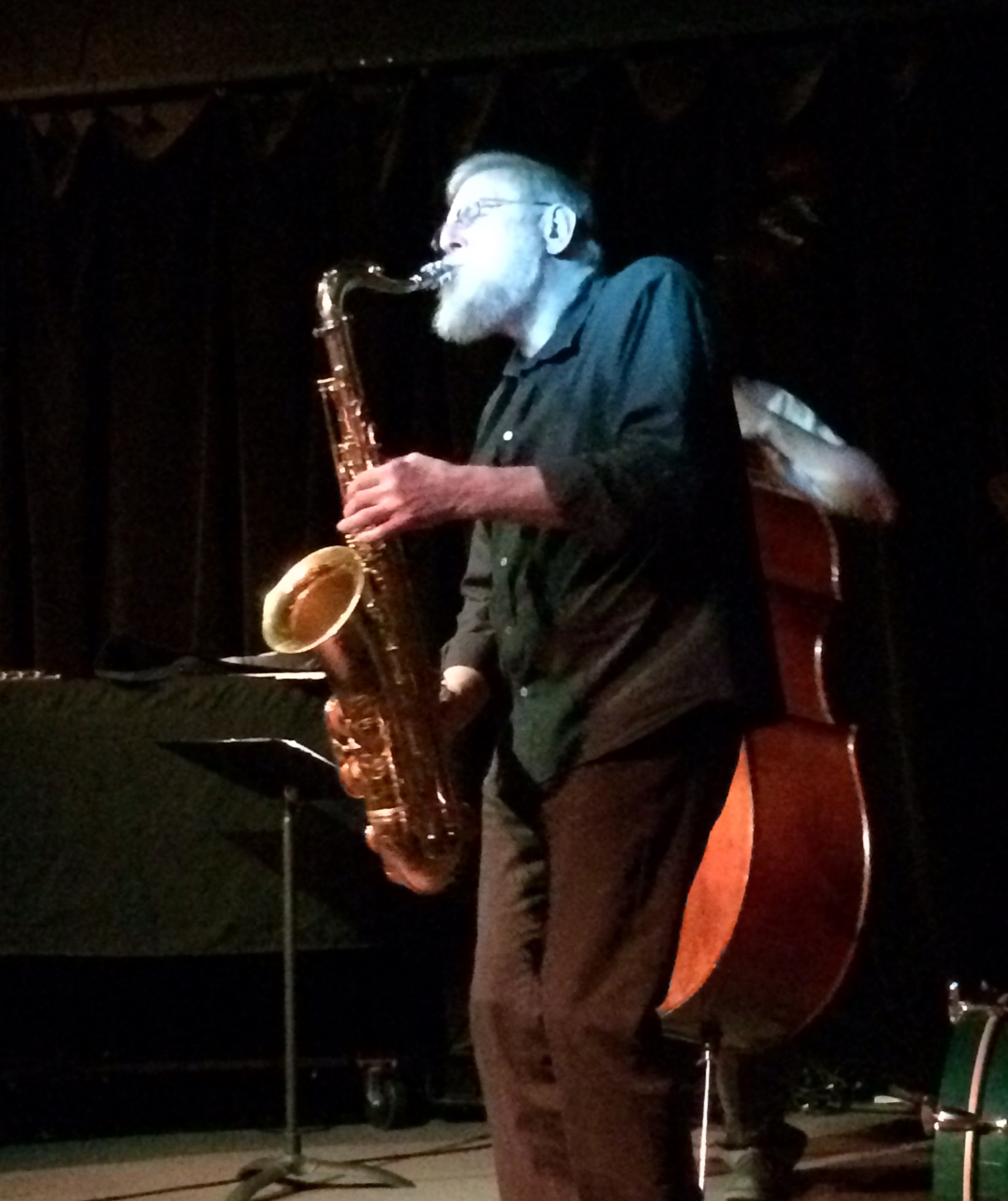

Background information
- Born: Lewis Barry Tabackin; March 26, 1940 (age 86); Philadelphia, Pennsylvania, U.S.
- Genres: Jazz
- Occupation: Musician
- Instruments: Tenor saxophone, flute
- Years active: 1962–present
- Labels: RCA Victor/BMG, Discomate, Inner City
- Website: www.lewtabackin.com

Lewis Barry Tabackin (born March 26, 1940) is an American jazz tenor saxophonist and flutist. He is married to pianist Toshiko Akiyoshi with whom he has co-led large ensembles since the 1970s.

== Biography ==
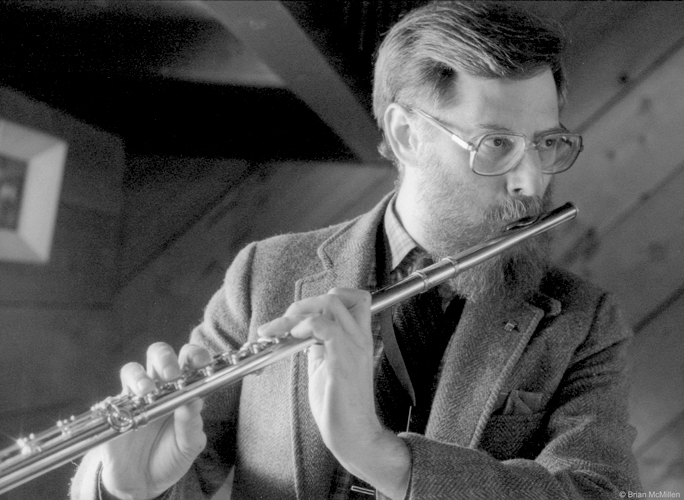
Lew Tabackin at Bach Dancing & Dynamite Society, Half Moon Bay, California, June 3, 1984

Tabackin started learning flute at age 12, followed by tenor saxophone at age 15. He has cited Al Cohn and Coleman Hawkins as influences on saxophone, while his flute role models include classical players such as William Kincaid, Julius Baker, and Jean-Pierre Rampal. Tabackin studied flute at the Philadelphia Conservatory of Music and also studied music with composer Vincent Persichetti. In 1962 he graduated from the Conservatory and after serving with the U.S. Army worked with Tal Farlow. He also worked with Chuck Israels in New York City and a band that included Elvin Jones, Donald Byrd, and Roland Hanna. Later he was a member of The Dick Cavett Show band and The Tonight Show Band with Doc Severinsen. He moved from New York to California with The Tonight Show in 1972. During this time he played with Shelly Manne and Billy Higgins.

Tabackin met Toshiko Akiyoshi in 1967 while he was playing in Clark Terry's band and she was invited to sit in for Don Friedman. They formed a quartet in the late 1960s, married in 1969, and in 1973 co-founded the Toshiko Akiyoshi – Lew Tabackin Big Band in Los Angeles, which later became the Toshiko Akiyoshi Jazz Orchestra featuring Lew Tabackin, playing bebop in Duke Ellington-influenced arrangements and compositions by Akiyoshi. Tabackin was principal soloist for the band from 1973 through 2003.

Critic Scott Yanow describes Tabackin as "one of the few jazz musicians who has been able to develop completely different musical personalities on two instruments", with his forceful hard bop style on sax contrasting with his delicate flute playing.

== Jazz Foundation of America ==
Tabackin supports the Jazz Foundation of America in its mission to help elderly jazz and blues musicians, including those affected by Hurricane Katrina. He has sat on the Advisory Committee of the Foundation since 2002.

== Discography ==
=== As leader or co-leader ===
- Tabackin (Inner City, 1974) – also released as Let the Tape Roll (RCA)
- Day Dream (RCA, 1976)
- Tenor Gladness with Warne Marsh (Discomate | Inner City, 1976)
- Dual Nature (Inner City, 1976)
- Trackin' (RCA, 1976)
- Rites of Pan (Discomate/Inner City, 1977)
- Vintage Tenor (RCA, 1978) – with Toshiyuki Miyama And His New Herd
- Lew Tabackin Meets the Tadpoles (Insights, 1979)
- Black and Tan Fantasy (Discomate | Ascent | Jazz America Marketing (JAM), 1979)
- Phil Woods/Lew Tabackin (Omnisound | Evidence, 1980)
- Threedom (Discomate, 1980)
- Duo: John Lewis & Lew Tabackin (Toshiba EMI, 1981)
- My Old Flame (Atlas, 1982)
- Lew Tabackin Quartet with Randy Brecker,... (Toshiba EMI, 1983)
- Angelica (Toshiba EMI, 1985)
- Desert Lady (Concord, 1989)
- I'll Be Seeing You (Concord, 1992)
- What a Little Moonlight Can Do (Concord, 1994)
- Live at Vartan's (Vartan Jazz, 1994)
- L' Archiduc - Round About Five (Igloo Jazz, 1996)
- Tenority (Concord, 1996)
- In a Sentimental Mood (Camerata | Insights, 1998)
- Pyramid (Koch Jazz, 1999)
- Tanuki's Night Out - Lew Tabackin Trio (2002)
- Vintage: Duke Ellington Songbook (T-toc Records, 2008) – with Toshiko Akiyoshi
- Live in Paris - Lew Tabackin Trio (2008)
- Jazz na Hradě, Lew Tabackin Quartet (Multisonic, 2009)
- Soundscapes (2016)
- The Eternal Duo! (Sony, 2019) – with Toshiko Akiyoshi

=== Toshiko Akiyoshi – Lew Tabackin Big Band ===
- Kogun (1974)
- Long Yellow Road (1975)
- Tales of a Courtesan (Oirantan) (1975) also known as HANA KAI TAN (花魁譚)
- Road Time (1976)
- Insights (1976)
- March of the Tadpoles (1977)
- Live at Newport '77 (1977)
- Live at Newport II (1977)
- Salted Gingko Nuts (1978) also known as SHIO GIN NAN (塩銀杏)
- Sumi-e (1979)
- Farewell (1980)
- From Toshiko with Love (1981) also released as Tanuki's Night Out
- European Memoirs (1982)

=== Toshiko Akiyoshi Jazz Orchestra featuring Lew Tabackin ===
- Ten Gallon Shuffle (1984)
- Wishing Peace (1986)
- Carnegie Hall Concert (1992)
- Desert Lady / Fantasy (1993)
- Four Seasons of Morita Village (1996)
- Monopoly Game (1998)
- Tribute to Duke Ellington (1999)
- Hiroshima - Rising from the Abyss (2001)
- Last Live in Blue Note Tokyo (2003)
- Toshiko Akiyoshi Jazz Orchestra in Shanghai (2011)

=== Akiyoshi - Tabackin Big Band compilations ===
- Mosaic Select: Toshiko Akiyoshi - Lew Tabackin Big Band (Mosaic, 2008)
- NOVUS Series '70: The Toshiko Akiyoshi - Lew Tabackin Big Band (BMG/Novus)
- Eternal Best / Best 8 (BMG)
- The Best of Toshiko Akiyoshi (BMG)

=== As sideman ===
With Toshiko Akiyoshi

- Toshiko at Top of the Gate (Nippon Columbia, 1969)
- Toshiko Akiyoshi in Japan aka Long Yellow Road (Toshiba, 1970)
- Jazz, the Personal Dimension (Victor, 1971)
- Meditation (Dan, 1971)
- Sumie (Victor, 1971)
- Yes, I Have No 4 Beat Today (Nippon Crown, 1995)
- Time Stream: Toshiko Plays Toshiko (Nippon Crown, 1996)
- 50th Anniversary Concert in Japan (T-toc, 2006)

With Donald Byrd

- Fancy Free (Blue Note, 1969)
- Electric Byrd (Blue Note, 1970)
- Kofi (Blue Note, 1995)

With Benny Carter

- Central City Sketches (MusicMasters, 1987)

With Harmonie Ensemble/New York

- Tchaikovsky, Ellington, Strayhorn: Nutcracker Suites (Harmonia Mundi, 2013)
- Henry Mancini: Music for Peter Gunn (Harmonia Mundi, 2014)

With Shelly Manne

- Plays Richard Rodgers' Musical "Rex" (Discovery, 1976)
- Essence (Galaxy, 1977)

With Duke Pearson

- Introducing Duke Pearson's Big Band (Blue Note, 1968)
- Now Hear This (Blue Note, 1969)
- I Don't Care Who Knows It (Blue Note, 1996)

With Carla White

- Listen Here (Evidence, 1991)
- Mood Swings (Milestone, 1992)
- The Sweetest Sounds (DIW, 2000)

With others

- Ridin' High, Maynard Ferguson (Enterprise, 1967)
- The Jazz Composer's Orchestra, Jazz Composer's Orchestra(ECM, 1968)
- Jimmy Knepper in L.A., Jimmy Knepper (Discomate/Inner City, 1977)
- Jukin', The Manhattan Transfer (Capitol, 1971)
- White Heat, Barry Miles (Mainstream, 1971)
- Night Blooming, Leonard Feather (Mainstream, 1972)
- Small Change, Tom Waits (Asylum, 1976)
- Ecue Ritmos Cubanos, Louie Bellson (Pablo, 1977)
- Shortcake, Bill Berry (Concord, 1978)
- Sweet Return, Freddie Hubbard (Atlantic, 1983)
- Blues-O-Matic, John Colianni (Concord, 1988)
- Take Your Pick, Howard Alden (Concord, 1996)
- Jazz Takes on Joni Mitchell, David Lahm (Arkadia Jazz, 1999)
- The Philadelphia Story, Jimmy Amadie (TPR, 2007)

=== Video ===
- My Elegy (Pioneer LaserDisc, 1984)
- Strive For Jive (V.I.E.W. Video, 1992)
- In Shanghai (Pony Canyon, 2011)
- The Eternal Duo! (Sony, 2019) – with Toshiko Akiyoshi

== Awards and honors ==
DownBeat magazine Critic's Poll winner:

- Jazz Album of the Year: 1978 (Insights)
- Big Band: 1979, 1980, 1981, 1982, 1983
- Flute: 1980, 1981, 2010

DownBeat magazine Readers' Poll winner:

- Big Band: 1978, 1979, 1980, 1981, 1982
- Flute: 1981, 1982

Grammy Award nominations:

- Best Jazz Instrumental Performance - Big Band: 1976 (Long Yellow Road), 1977 (Road Time), 1978 (Insights), 1979 (Kogun), 1980 (Farewell), 1981 (Tanuki's Night Out), 1984 (Ten Gallon Shuffle), 1985 (March of the Tadpoles), 1992 (Carnegie Hall Concert), 1994 (Desert Lady / Fantasy)

Swing Journal awards:

- Gold Disk: 1976 (Insights), Silver Disk: 1974 (Kogun), 1979 (Salted Gingko Nuts), 1996 (Four Seasons of Morita Village)
