= Bobby Shew =

American jazz trumpet and flugelhorn player

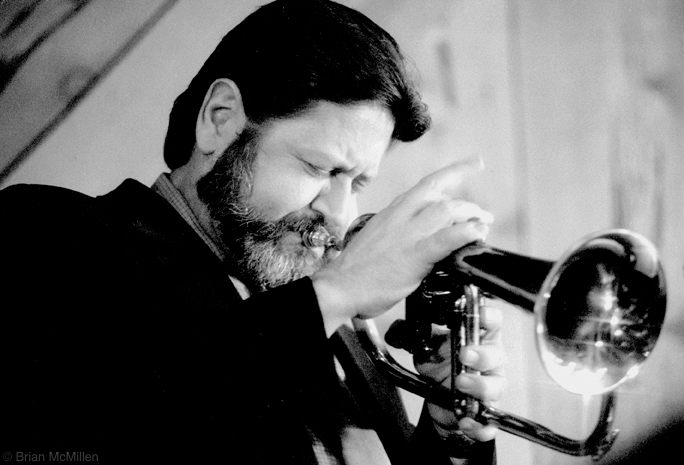
- Bobby Shew on flugelhorn, c. 1982

Background information
- Born: Robert Shew; March 4, 1941 (age 85)
- Origin: Albuquerque, New Mexico, U.S.
- Genres: Big band Jazz
- Occupation: Musician
- Instruments: Trumpet; Flugelhorn
- Years active: 1960–present
- Labels: RCA; Concord, MAMA
- Military service
- Allegiance: United States
- Branch: United States Army
- Service years: 1960–1963
- Unit: NORAD Joint Forces Band
- Website: bobbyshew.com

Bobby Shew (born March 4, 1941) is an American jazz trumpet and flugelhorn player.

== Biography ==
He was born in Albuquerque, New Mexico, United States. After leaving college in 1960, Shew was drafted into the U.S. Army and played trumpet and toured with the NORAD joint forces band stationed in Colorado Springs. After leaving the Army, Shew joined Tommy Dorsey's band and then played with the Woody Herman and then the Buddy Rich big bands in the mid-to-late 1960s. He was a trumpeter in Tom Jones's band while in Las Vegas, and is featured on his 1971 live album Live at Caesar's Palace. In 1972, Shew moved from Las Vegas to Los Angeles, where he did much studio work as well as play with some of the top big bands of the era through the end of the 1970s: Akiyoshi/Tabackin, Louis Bellson, Maynard Ferguson, and others. In addition to playing on several notable big band recordings starting in the 1960s, Shew recorded several albums as leader, starting with Debut in 1978.

Over his more than 70 years of teaching, Shew's trumpet students have ranged from serious amateur musicians to many of the top trumpet players in the world. Shew has mentored jazz musicians in New Mexico and has led the Albuquerque Jazz Orchestra. He has taught a two-week workshop for high school students at the Skidmore Summer Jazz Institute in Saratoga Springs, New York. Shew also performs and teaches worldwide, including a two-week residency at the Graz University of Music in Austria in 2017. He has taught at leading European music schools in Austria, Germany, the Netherlands, Switzerland and also in Canada.

== Discography ==
=== As leader ===
- Debut (Disco Mate, 1978)
- Outstanding In His Field (Inner City, 1979)
- Class Reunion (Sutra, 1980)
- Play Song (Jazz Hounds, 1981)
- Telepathy (Jazz Hounds, 1982)
- Shewhorn (Pausa, 1983)
- Trumpets No End (Delos, 1983) – with Chuck Findley
- Round Midnight (MoPro, 1984)
- Breakfast Wine (Pausa, 1985)
- Aim For The Heart (Gateway, 1987) – with the Wigan Youth Jazz Orchestra
- Metropole Orchestra (Mons, 1988)
- Tribute to the Masters (Double-Time, 1995)
- Heavyweights (MAMA, 1996) – with Carl Fontana
- Playing With Fire (MAMA, 1997)
- Salsa Caliente (MAMA, 1998)
- The Music of John Harmon (Sea Breeze, 2001)
- Play Music of Reed Kottler (Torii, 2002) – with Gary Foster "and friends"
- Live in Switzerland (TCB, 2003) – Bobby Shew / George Robert Quintet
- I Can't Say No (Four Leaf Clover, 2003)
- One in a Million (Sea Breeze, 2004) – recorded 1990 with The Groovin' High Big Band / Peter Fleischhauer
- Cancaos Do Amor (Torii, 2007)
- LIVE 1983 (UF School of Music, 2015) – Recorded 1983 with University of Florida Jazz Band – Director Gary Langford

=== As sideman ===
With Louis Bellson

- The Louis Bellson Explosion (Pablo, 1975)
- Salute (Chiaroscuro, 2002)

With others

- Carmen McRae, Can't Hide Love (Blue Note, 1976)
- Rodger Fox Big Band, Heavy Company (Circular, 1981)
- Gerald Wilson, State Street Sweet (MAMA, 1995)

== Honors ==
- Outstanding in His Field Grammy nomination (1980)
