= Toshiko Akiyoshi – Lew Tabackin Big Band =

American big band

The Toshiko Akiyoshi – Lew Tabackin Big Band
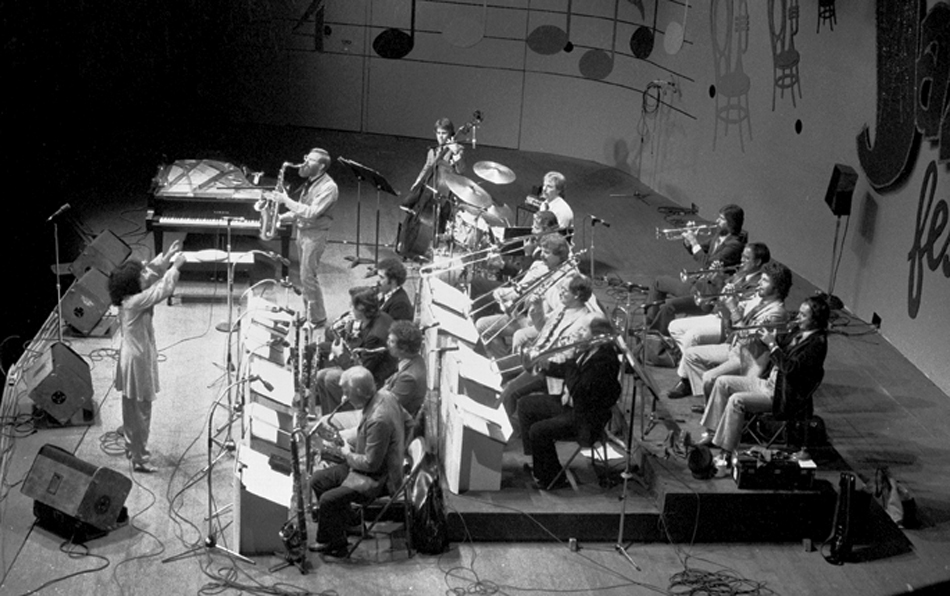
- Toshiko Akiyoshi-Lew Tabackin Big Band at Monterey Jazz Festival, Monterey, California, 1981

Background information
- Origin: Los Angeles, California
- Genres: Jazz, big band, bebop
- Years active: 1973–1982
- Labels: RCA Records/Victor, Baystate

The Toshiko Akiyoshi Jazz Orchestra featuring Lew Tabackin
- Origin: New York City
- Genres: Jazz, big band, bebop
- Years active: 1983–2003
- Labels: Sony/Columbia, Victor

The Toshiko Akiyoshi – Lew Tabackin Big Band was a 16 piece jazz big band created by pianist Toshiko Akiyoshi and tenor saxophone/flutist Lew Tabackin in Los Angeles in 1973. In 1982 the principals moved from Los Angeles to New York City and re-formed the group with new members under the name, The Toshiko Akiyoshi Jazz Orchestra featuring Lew Tabackin. Akiyoshi arranged all of the music for the band and composed nearly all of the music recorded by the two groups over a 30-year period. Tabackin served as the bands' featured soloist on tenor saxophone and flute. The two groups recorded 23 albums, toured in North America, Asia and Europe and, after the move to New York, had regular performances at the jazz club Birdland before disbanding in 2003. The bands' recordings received several Grammy nominations and regularly scored high in Down Beat magazine's critics' and readers' polls.

== Awards and honors ==
Down Beat magazine Critics' Poll winner:

- Jazz Album of the Year: 1978 (Insights)
- Big Band: 1979, 1980, 1981, 1982, 1983
- Arranger: 1979, 1982, 1990, 1995, 1996 (Akiyoshi)
- Composer: 1981, 1982 (Akiyoshi)
- Flute: 1980, 1981, (2010) (Tabackin)

Down Beat Magazine Readers' Poll winner:

- Big Band: 1978, 1979, 1980, 1981, 1982
- Arranger: 1978, 1979, 1980, 1981, 1982, 1989, 1995 (Akiyoshi)
- Composer: 1980, 1981, 1982, 1986 (Akiyoshi)
- Flute: 1981, 1982 (Tabackin)

Grammy award nominations:

- Best Jazz Instrumental Performance - Big Band: 1976 (Long Yellow Road), 1977 (Road Time), 1978 (Insights), 1979 (Kogun), 1980 (Farewell), 1981 (Tanuki's Night Out), 1984 (Ten Gallon Shuffle), 1985 (March of the Tadpoles), 1992 (Carnegie Hall Concert), 1994 (Desert Lady / Fantasy).
- Best Arrangement on an Instrumental: 1981 (for "A Bit Byas'd"), 1983 (for "Remembering Bud"), 1985 (for "March of the Tadpoles"), 1994 (for "Bebop").

Swing Journal (Japanese jazz magazine) awards:

- Gold Disk: 1976 (Insights),
- Silver Disk: 1974 (Kogun), 1979 (Salted Gingko Nuts), 1996 (Four Seasons of Morita Village)

Stereo Review Jazz Album of the Year: 1976 (Long Yellow Road)
