= Toshiko Akiyoshi =

American jazz musician (born 1929)

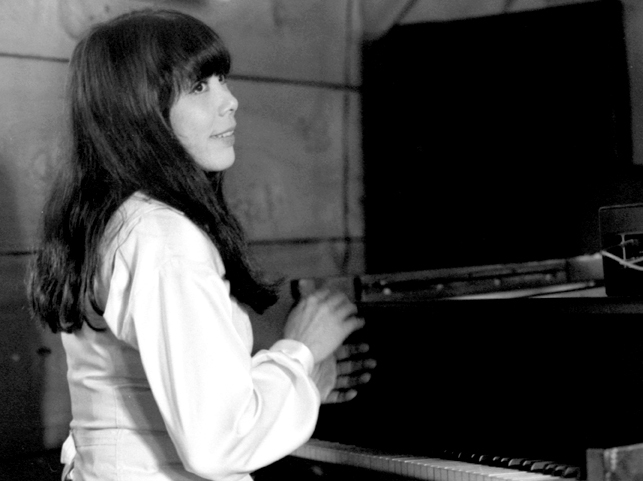
- Toshiko Akiyoshi in 1978

Background information
- Also known as: "Toshiko", Toshiko Mariano, 秋吉 敏子
- Born: Toshiko Akiyoshi (穐吉 敏子, Akiyoshi Toshiko); 12 December 1929 (age 96); Liaoyang, Manchuria, China
- Origin: Beppu, Japan
- Genres: Jazz
- Occupations: Musician; composer; arranger
- Instrument: Piano
- Years active: 1946–present
- Labels: Norgran, Columbia, Victor, RCA Victor, Discomate, Inner City, Nippon Crown
- Member of: Toshiko Akiyoshi Jazz Orchestra; Toshiko Akiyoshi – Lew Tabackin Big Band
- Formerly of: Toshiko – Mariano Quartet
- Education: Berklee College of Music

Signature
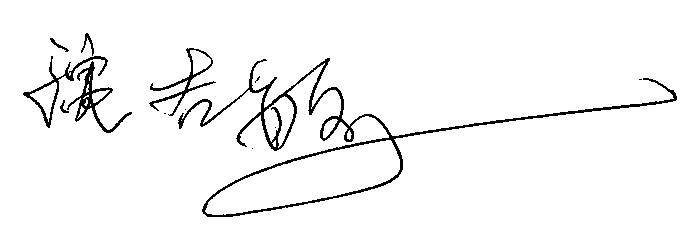

Toshiko Akiyoshi (秋吉敏子 or 穐吉敏子, Akiyoshi Toshiko; born 12 December 1929) is a Japanese jazz pianist, composer, arranger, and bandleader.

Akiyoshi received fourteen Grammy Award nominations and was the first woman to win Best Arranger and Composer awards in Down Beat magazine's annual Readers' Poll. In 1984, she was the subject of the documentary Jazz Is My Native Language. In 1996, she published her autobiography, Life with Jazz, and in 2007 she was named an NEA Jazz Master by the U.S. National Endowment for the Arts.

== Biography ==
Akiyoshi was born in Liaoyang, Manchuria, to a Japanese family, the youngest of four sisters. In 1945, after World War II, Akiyoshi's family lost their home and returned to Japan, settling in Beppu. A local record collector introduced her to jazz by playing a record of Teddy Wilson playing "Sweet Lorraine." She immediately loved the sound and began to study jazz. In 1953, during a tour of Japan, pianist Oscar Peterson discovered her playing in a club on the Ginza. Peterson was impressed and convinced record producer Norman Granz to record her. In 1953, under Granz's direction, she recorded her first album with Peterson's rhythm section: Herb Ellis on guitar, Ray Brown on double bass, and J. C. Heard on drums. The album was released with the title Toshiko's Piano in the U.S. and Amazing Toshiko Akiyoshi in Japan.

Akiyoshi studied jazz at the Berklee School of Music in Boston. In 1955, she wrote a letter to Lawrence Berk, asking him to give her a chance to study at his school. After a year of wrangling with the State Department and Japanese officials, Berk was given permission for Akiyoshi to enroll. He offered her a full scholarship and mailed her a plane ticket to Boston. In January 1956, she became the first Japanese student at Berklee. Soon after, she appeared as a contestant on the 18 March 1956 broadcast of the CBS television panel show What's My Line? In 1998, she was awarded an honorary doctorate of music from Berklee, by then known as the Berklee College of Music.

Akiyoshi experienced some difficulties as a Japanese-born jazz musician in America. Some music fans saw her as an oddity more than a talented musician, a Japanese girl playing jazz in America. According to Akiyoshi, some of her success was attributed to her being an oddity, saying in an interview with the Los Angeles Times, “In those days, a Japanese woman playing like Bud Powell was something very new. So all the press, the attention, wasn’t because I was authentic ... It was because I was strange”. Despite being born in Manchuria, Akiyoshi considers herself Japanese and, as of 2010, had not obtained American citizenship.

Akiyoshi married saxophonist Charlie Mariano in 1959. The couple had a daughter, Michiru. She and Mariano divorced in 1967 after forming several bands together. That same year she met saxophonist Lew Tabackin, whom she married in 1969. Akiyoshi, Tabackin, and Michiru moved to Los Angeles in 1972. In March 1973, Akiyoshi and Tabackin formed a 16-piece big band composed of studio musicians. Akiyoshi composed and arranged music for the band, and Tabackin served as the band's featured soloist on tenor saxophone and flute. The band recorded its first album, Kogun, in 1974. The title, which translates to "one-man army", was inspired by the tale of a Japanese soldier lost for 30 years in the jungle who believed that World War II was still being fought and thus remained loyal to the Emperor. Kogun was commercially successful in Japan, and the band began to receive critical acclaim.

The couple moved to New York City in 1982 and assembled the Toshiko Akiyoshi Jazz Orchestra featuring Lew Tabackin. Akiyoshi toured with smaller bands to raise money for her big band. Years later, BMG continued to release her big band's recordings in Japan but remained skeptical about releasing the music in the United States Although Akiyoshi was able to release several albums in the U.S. featuring her piano in solo and small combo settings, many of her later big band albums were released only in Japan.

On 29 December 2003, her band played its final concert at Birdland in New York City, where it had enjoyed a regular Monday night gig for more than seven years. Akiyoshi explained that she disbanded the ensemble because she was frustrated by her inability to obtain American recording contracts for the big band. She also said that she wanted to concentrate on her piano playing from which she had been distracted by years of composing and arranging. She has said that although she has rarely recorded as a solo pianist, that is her preferred format. On 24 March 2004, Warner Japan released the final recording of Akiyoshi's big band. Titled Last Live in Blue Note Tokyo, the album was recorded 28–29 November 2003.

== Music ==
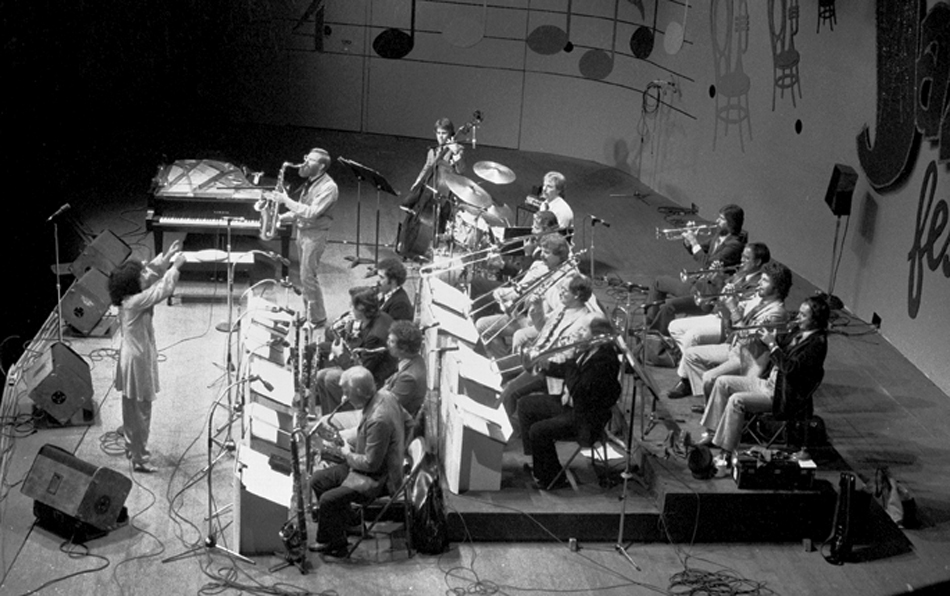
Toshiko Akiyoshi-Lew Tabackin Big Band

Akiyoshi's Japanese heritage is distinctly present in her music and sets her compositions apart from other jazz musicians. When Duke Ellington died in 1974, Nat Hentoff wrote in The Village Voice that Ellington's music reflected his African heritage. Akiyoshi was inspired to investigate her Japanese musical heritage. She composed using Japanese themes, harmonies, and instruments (kotsuzumi, kakko, utai, tsugaru shamisen). But her music remained planted firmly in jazz, reflecting influences from Duke Ellington, Charles Mingus, and Bud Powell.

One reviewer of the live album Road Time said the music on Akiyoshi's big band albums demonstrated "a level of compositional and orchestral ingenuity that made her one of perhaps two or three composer-arrangers in jazz whose name could seriously be mentioned in the company of Duke Ellington, Eddie Sauter, and Gil Evans."

In 1999, Akiyoshi was approached by Kyudo Nakagawa, a Buddhist priest, who asked her to write a piece for his hometown of Hiroshima. He sent her some photos of the aftermath of the nuclear bombing. Her initial reaction was horror. She could not see how she could compose anything to address the event. Finally, she found a picture of a young woman emerging from an underground shelter with a faint smile on her face. Akiyoshi said that after seeing this picture, she understood the message: hope. With that message in mind, she composed the three-part suite Hiroshima: Rising from the Abyss. The piece was premiered in Hiroshima on 6 August 2001, the 56th anniversary of the Hiroshima bombing. The Hiroshima suite appeared on the 2002 album Hiroshima – Rising from the Abyss.

== Awards and honours ==
- NEA Jazz Master, 2007
- Jazz Album of the Year: Long Yellow Road, Stereo Review, 1976
- Gold Disk: Insights, Swing Journal
- Silver Disk: Kogun, Salted Gingko Nuts, Four Seasons of Morita Village, Swing Journal
- Special Award: (50th Anniversary Concert in Japan), Swing Journal
- Down Beat magazine Readers' Poll winner:
  - Arranger: 1978, 1979, 1980, 1981, 1982, 1989, 1995
  - Big Band: 1978, 1979, 1980, 1981, 1982
  - Composer: 1980, 1981, 1982, 1986
- Down Beat magazine Critics' Poll winner:
  - Jazz Album of the Year: 1978 (Insights)
  - Arranger: 1979, 1982, 1990, 1995, 1996
  - Big Band: 1979, 1980, 1981, 1982, 1983
  - Composer: 1981, 1982
- Grammy Award nominations:
  - Best Jazz Instrumental Performance – Big Band: 1976 (Long Yellow Road), 1977 (Road Time), 1978 (Insights), 1979 (Kogun), 1980 (Farewell), 1981 (Tanuki's Night Out), 1984 (Ten Gallon Shuffle), 1985 (March of the Tadpoles), 1992 (Carnegie Hall Concert), 1994 (Desert Lady / Fantasy).
  - Best Arrangement on an Instrumental: 1981 (for "A Bit Byas'd"), 1983 (for "Remembering Bud"), 1985 (for "March of the Tadpoles"), 1994 (for "Bebop")
- Order of the Rising Sun, Gold Rays with Rosette, 2004

== Discography ==
- 1954 Toshiko's Piano (Norgran)
- 1956 The Toshiko Trio (Storyville)
- 1956 Toshiko – Her Trio, Her Quartet (Storyville)
- 1957 Toshiko and Leon Sash at Newport (Verve)
- 1957 The Many Sides of Toshiko (Verve)
- 1958 United Notions (MetroJazz)
- 1961 The Toshiko–Mariano Quartet (Candid)
- 1961 Long Yellow Road (Asahi Sonorama)
- 1961 Toshiko Meets Her Old Pals (King)
- 1963 Toshiko–Mariano Quartet (in West Side) (Takt/Nippon Columbia)
- 1963 East and West (RCA Victor)
- 1963 The Country and Western Sound of Jazz Pianos with Steve Kuhn (Dauntless)
- 1963 Miwaku No Jazz (Victor)
- 1964 Toshiko Mariano and her Big Band (Vee-Jay Records)
- 1965 Lullabies for You (Nippon Columbia)
- 1969 Toshiko at Top of the Gate (Nippon Columbia)
- 1970 Toshiko Akiyoshi in Japan (Liberty)
- 1971 Jazz, the Personal Dimension (Victor)
- 1971 Meditation (Dan Records)
- 1971 Sumie (Victor)
- 1971 Solo Piano (RCA Victor)
- 1974 Kogun (RCA)
- 1975 Long Yellow Road (RCA)
- 1976 Tales of a Courtesan (Oirantan) (RCA)
- 1976 Road Time (RCA)
- 1976 Insights (RCA)
- 1976 Dedications (Discomate)
- 1977 Dedications II (Discomate)
- 1977 March of the Tadpoles (RCA)
- 1977 Live at Newport '77 (RCA)
- 1977 Live at Newport II (RCA)
- 1978 Salted Gingko Nuts (Ascent)
- 1978 Toshiko Plays Billy Strayhorn (Discomate)
- 1978 Finesse (Concord Jazz)
- 1979 Notorious Tourist from the East (Inner City)
- 1979 Sumi-e (Insights)
- 1980 Farewell (RCA)
- 1981 From Toshiko with Love (Baystate)
- 1982 European Memoirs (Baystate)
- 1983 Toshiko Akiyoshi Trio (Eastworld)
- 1984 Ten Gallon Shuffle (Baystate)
- 1984 Time Stream (Toshiko Akiyoshi Trio album) (Eastworld)
- 1986 Wishing Peace (Ascent)
- 1987 Interlude (Concord Jazz)
- 1990 Four Seasons (Nippon Crown/Ninety-One)
- 1991 Chic Lady (Ninety-One)
- 1991 Live at Birdland (Fresh Sound)
- 1992 Carnegie Hall Concert (Columbia Records)
- 1992 Remembering Bud: Cleopatra's Dream (Evidence)
- 1994 Desert Lady / Fantasy (Columbia)
- 1993 Dig (Ninety-One)
- 1994 Night and Dream (Ninety-One)
- 1995 Yes, I Have No 4 Beat Today (Ninety-One)
- 1994 Toshiko Akiyoshi at Maybeck (Concord Jazz)
- 1996 Four Seasons of Morita Village (Novus)
- 1996 Time Stream: Toshiko Plays Toshiko (Ninety-One)
- 1997 Toshiko Akiyoshi Trio Live at Blue Note Tokyo '97 (Ninety-One)
- 1998 Monopoly Game (Novus)
- 1999 Sketches of Japan (Ninety-One)
- 1999 Tribute to Duke Ellington (Novus)
- 2000 Toshiko Akiyoshi Solo Live at the Kennedy Center (Crown)
- 2001 Hiroshima – Rising from the Abyss (Video Arts)
- 2004 Last Live in Blue Note Tokyo (Warner Music)
- 2004 New York Sketch Book (Ninety-One)
- 2006 Hope (Ninety-One)
- 2006 50th Anniversary Concert in Japan (T-toc Records)
- 2008 Let Freedom Swing with the SWR Big Band (Hänssler)
- 2008 Vintage (Toshiko Akiyoshi and Lew Tabackin album) (T-toc Records)
- 2009 Solo Live 2004 (Live at "Studio F") (Studio Songs)
- 2010 Classic Encounters (Studio Songs)
- 2011 Toshiko Akiyoshi Jazz Orchestra in Shanghai (Pony Canyon)
- 2015 Jazz Conversations (Victor Entertainment)
- 2016 Toshiko Akiyoshi Plays Gershwin's Porgy And Bess (Studio Songs)
- 2017 My Long Yellow Road (Studio Songs)
- 2019 The Eternal Duo! (Sony)

== Notes ==
- "100 Jazz Profiles: Toshiko Akiyoshi" (link) BBC Radio 3; accessed 18 May 2007
- "Jazz Import" (link) Time, 26 August 1957
- "Toshiko's Boston Breakout" (archived link) Berklee College of Music, News@Berklee.edu, c. 1998; accessed 26 May 2007
- Hazell, Ed. "Playing Shape" (archived link) Berklee College of Music, News@Berklee.edu, 2 June 2004; accessed 26 May 2007
- Helland, Dave. "Bio: Toshiko Akiyoshi" (archived link) Down Beat.com; accessed 18 May 2007
- Jung, Fred. "A Fireside Chat With Toshiko Akiyoshi" (link) All About Jazz, 20 April 2003; accessed 18 May 2007
- Weiers, Matt. "An Interview with Toshiko Akiyoshi" (link) Allegro, 2004 March (Volume CIV, No. 3).
- Yanow, Scott. "Biography: Toshiko Akiyoshi" (link), allmusic.com; accessed 18 May 2007.
- Ogawa, Takao. "Jazz in Japan through Testimonials · 証言で綴る日本のジャズ" (Komakusa Publishing) 2015, Language: Japanese ISBN 978-4-905447-71-9, p. 90-110.
