= Desert Lady / Fantasy =

Studio album by Toshiko Akiyoshi Jazz Orchestra
- Released: 1994
- Recorded: Clinton Recording, New York, NY, 1993 December 1–3
- Genre: Jazz
- Length: 57:24
- Label: Columbia
- Producer: Lew Tabackin and Toshiko Akiyoshi

Toshiko Akiyoshi Jazz Orchestra chronology
Carnegie Hall Concert (1992)	Desert Lady / Fantasy (1994)	Four Seasons of Morita Village (1996)

Professional ratings
Review scores
Source	Rating
Allmusic link	4/5 stars

Desert Lady / Fantasy is the fourth recording released by the Toshiko Akiyoshi Jazz Orchestra featuring Lew Tabackin. Not to be confused with the 1989 Lew Tabackin (Quartet) Concord Records release, Desert Lady. The album received two Grammy Award nominations in the "Best Large Jazz Ensemble Performance" and (for the song, "Bebop") "Best Arrangement on an Instrumental" categories.

== Track listing ==
All arrangements by Akiyoshi. All songs composed by Akiyoshi except as noted:

1. "Harlequin Tears" – 8:15
2. "Desert Lady" / "Fantasy" (Tabackin / Akiyoshi) – 15:39
3. "Hangin' Loose" – 9:38
4. "Hiroko's Delight" – 8:48
5. "Broken Dreams" (Tabackin) – 8:25
6. "Bebop" (Gillespie) – 6:37

== Personnel ==
- Toshiko Akiyoshi – piano
- Lew Tabackin – tenor saxophone, flute (piccolo)
- Walt Weiskopf – tenor saxophone, soprano saxophone, flute
- Jerry Dodgion – alto saxophone, soprano saxophone, flute
- Jim Snidero – alto saxophone, soprano saxophone, flute
- Scott Robinson – baritone saxophone, bass clarinet
- Michael Ponella – trumpet
- John Eckert – trumpet
- Greg Gisbert – trumpet
- Joe Magnarelli – trumpet
- Herb Besson – trombone
- Luis Bonilla – trombone
- Conrad Herwig – trombone
- Tim Newman – bass trombone
- Doug Weiss – bass
- Terry Clarke – drums

Guest

- Daniel Ponce – conga drums (track 2, "Desert Lady" / "Fantasy")

== References / external links ==
- Columbia CK-57856
- Allmusic
- 1994 Grammy nominations, Best Large Jazz Ensemble Performance and (for the song, "Bebop") Best Arrangement on an Instrumental (LA Times link)
