= Four Seasons of Morita Village =

Album by Toshiko Akiyoshi – Lew Tabackin Big Band

Four Seasons Of Morita Village

Studio album by Toshiko Akiyoshi Jazz Orchestra
- Released: October 23, 1996
- Recorded: Clinton Recording Studios, New York, NY, July 2, 1996
- Genre: Jazz
- Length: 58:27
- Label: BMG Victor / Novus J
- Producer: Toshiko Akiyoshi and (Ex. Prod.) Fumimaru Kawashima

Toshiko Akiyoshi Jazz Orchestra chronology
Desert Lady / Fantasy (1994)	Four Seasons Of Morita Village (1996)	Monopoly Game (1998)

Professional ratings
Review scores
Source	Rating
Allmusic link	4/5 stars

Four Seasons of Morita Village is the fifth album recorded by the Toshiko Akiyoshi Jazz Orchestra featuring Lew Tabackin. It was released in 1996 and won the Swing Journal Silver Disk Award for that year. The central "Four Seasons of Morita Village Suite" was commissioned by Morita Village in Aomori Prefecture, Japan. This recording is not to be confused with the 1990 (Nippon Crown) Toshiko Akiyoshi Trio recording, Four Seasons.

== Track listing ==
All songs composed and arranged by Toshiko Akiyoshi:

1. "Dance of the Gremlins" – 7:48
2. "Repose" – 7:21
3. "Pollination" – 12:16
4. "Norito" – 6:40
5. "Harvest Shuffle" – 7:59
6. "Retro Zone" – 10:39
7. "China Remembered" – 5:44

"Repose", "Pollination", "Norito" and "Harvest Shuffle" make up the four part "Four Seasons of Morita Village Suite"

== Personnel ==
- Toshiko Akiyoshi – piano
- Lew Tabackin – tenor saxophone, flute
- Walt Weiskopf – tenor saxophone, flute, clarinet
- Dave Pietro – alto saxophone, flute, clarinet
- Jim Snidero – alto saxophone, flute
- Scott Robinson – baritone saxophone, bass clarinet
- Mike Ponella – trumpet
- John Eckert – trumpet
- Andy Gravish – trumpet
- Joe Magnarelli – trumpet
- Scott Whitfield – trombone
- Pat Hallaran – trombone
- Joel Helleny – trombone
- Tim Newman – bass trombone
- Doug Weiss – bass
- Terry Clarke – drums

Other

- Kenichi Nagamine – tsugaru shamisen

== References / External Links ==
- BMG Novus J BVCJ-638
- Allmusic
