= Carnegie Hall Concert (Toshiko Akiyoshi Jazz Orchestra album) =

Live album by Toshiko Akiyoshi Jazz Orchestra
- Released: 1992
- Recorded: Carnegie Hall, New York, NY, 1991 September 20
- Genre: Jazz
- Length: 76:39
- Label: Columbia
- Producer: Dr. George Butler

Toshiko Akiyoshi Jazz Orchestra chronology
Wishing Peace (1986)	Carnegie Hall Concert (1992)	Desert Lady / Fantasy (1994)

Professional ratings
Review scores
Source	Rating
Allmusic link	4.5/5 stars

Carnegie Hall Concert is the third recording released by the Toshiko Akiyoshi Jazz Orchestra featuring Lew Tabackin. The album received a 1992 Grammy Award nomination in the category "Best Large Jazz Ensemble Performance."

== Track listing ==
All arrangements by Akiyoshi. All songs composed by Akiyoshi except as noted:

1. (spoken introductions of band members) – 0:54
2. "Children of the Universe" – 16:42
3. "I Know Who Loves You" – 8:19
4. "After Mr. Teng" – 9:33
5. "Your Beauty is a Song of Love" (Wess) – 6:41
6. "Kourakan Suite" – 21:00
  1. Part 1: "Kourakan"
  2. Part 2: "Prayer"
7. "Chasing After Love" – 9:22
8. "How Do You Get To Carnegie Hall?" – 4:09

== Personnel ==
- Toshiko Akiyoshi – piano
- Lew Tabackin – tenor saxophone, flute
- Frank Wess – alto saxophone, flute
- Jim Snidero – alto saxophone, soprano saxophone, flute, clarinet, piccolo
- Walt Weiskopf – tenor saxophone, soprano saxophone, flute, clarinet,
- Scott Robinson – baritone saxophone, bass clarinet
- Freddie Hubbard – trumpet
- Mike Ponella – trumpet
- John Eckert – trumpet
- Greg Gisbert – trumpet
- Joe Magnarelli – trumpet
- Herb Besson – trombone
- Conrad Herwig – trombone
- Larry Ferrel – trombone
- Matt Finders – bass trombone
- Peter Washington – bass
- Terry Clarke – drums

Guest

- Nnenna Freelon – Vocal (Kourakan Suite Part 2, "Prayer")

== References / External Links ==
- Columbia CK-48805
- Allmusic
- 1992 Grammy nomination, Best Large Jazz Ensemble Performance (LA Times link)
