= Toshiko Akiyoshi Jazz Orchestra in Shanghai =

2010 live concert recording

Live album by Toshiko Akiyoshi Jazz Orchestra
- Released: 2011 January
- Recorded: October 17, 2010, Shanghai Oriental Art Center Concert Hall
- Genre: Jazz
- Label: Pony Canyon

Toshiko Akiyoshi Jazz Orchestra chronology
Last Live in Blue Note Tokyo (2003)	Toshiko Akiyoshi Jazz Orchestra in Shanghai (2011)

Toshiko Akiyoshi Jazz Orchestra in Shanghai

Video by Toshiko Akiyoshi Jazz Orchestra
- Released: 2011 March
- Recorded: 2010 October
- Genre: Jazz
- Length: 120:00
- Label: Pony Canyon

Toshiko Akiyoshi Jazz Orchestra chronology
Strive For Jive (1985)	Toshiko Akiyoshi Jazz Orchestra in Shanghai (2011)

In Shanghai is a live concert recording made by the Toshiko Akiyoshi Jazz Orchestra featuring Lew Tabackin in October, 2010 in Shanghai. An audio CD version was released by Pony Canyon in Japan in January, 2011 and a DVD video version was released in March of the same year. Although the New York–based Orchestra had officially disbanded in 2003, they have reformed on occasion to perform special tours and concerts like this one.

== Track listing ==
=== CD ===
All compositions and arrangements by Toshiko Akiyoshi except as noted.

1. "Long Yellow Road"
2. "I Know Who Loves You"
3. "My Teacher, Mr. Yang"
4. "Kangding Qingge" (康定情歌 = "Kangding Love Song", traditional Chinese ballad)
5. "Drum Conference"
6. "Hope"

=== DVD video ===
1. opening
2. "Long Yellow Road"
3. "My Teacher, Mr. Yang"
4. "I Know Who Loves You"
5. "Kangding Qingge"
6. "Autumn Sea"
7. "Drum Conference"
8. "Hope"

(also additional DVD bonus material)

== Personnel ==
- Toshiko Akiyoshi – piano
- Lew Tabackin – tenor saxophone, flute
- Tom Christensen – tenor saxophone
- Dave Pietro – alto saxophone, flute
- David Bixler – alto saxophone
- Mark Lopeman – baritone saxophone
- Dan Levine – trombone
- Alan Ferber – trombone
- Andy Hunter – trombone
- Tim Newman – bass trombone
- Mike Ponella – trumpet
- John Eckert – trumpet
- Joe Magnarelli – trumpet
- Alex Sipiagin – trumpet
- Paul Gill – bass
- Andy Watson – drums
- Wilson "Chembo" Corneil – congas

Special guests

- Monday Michiru – vocal
- 王 顛 – 二胡 (erhu)
- 範 再 – 古箏 (zheng)
- 呉 暁光 – 大太鼓 (ōdaiko)
