= Monopoly Game =

Studio album by Toshiko Akiyoshi Jazz Orchestra
- Released: 1998
- Recorded: Avatar Studios, New York, 23–25 June 1998
- Genre: Jazz
- Length: 61:10
- Label: BMG / Novus-J
- Producer: Toshiko Akiyoshi, Ex. Producer: Ikuyoshi Hirakawa

Toshiko Akiyoshi Jazz Orchestra chronology
Four Seasons of Morita Village (1996)	Monopoly Game (1998)	Tribute to Duke Ellington (1999)

Monopoly Game is the sixth recording released by the Toshiko Akiyoshi Jazz Orchestra featuring Lew Tabackin. The three tracks, "Kyoto Paradox", Caribbean Dream" and "Urban Rhapsody" make up the three-part "Suite for Koto and Jazz Orchestra" commissioned jointly by the San Francisco Jazz Festival and UCLA. The song "Jazz Club" was commissioned by NHK Radio.

== Track listing ==
All songs composed and arranged by Toshiko Akiyoshi:

1. "Jazz Club (Opener)" – 2:56
2. "Glass Ceiling" – 7:50
3. "Monopoly Game" – 10:17
4. "Kyoto Paradox" – 9:41
5. "Caribbean Dream" – 12:30
6. "Urban Rhapsody" – 10:55
7. "State of the Unison" – 7:01

== Personnel ==
- Toshiko Akiyoshi – piano
- Lew Tabackin – tenor saxophone, flute
- Tom Christensen – tenor saxophone, clarinet
- Dave Pietro – alto saxophone, flute
- Jim Snidero – alto saxophone, flute, clarinet
- Scott Robinson – baritone saxophone, bass clarinet
- Michael Ponella – trumpet
- Andy Gravish – trumpet
- John Eckert – trumpet
- Joe Magnarelli – trumpet
- Scott Whitfield – trombone
- Luis Bonilla – trombone
- Pat Hallaran – trombone
- Tim Newman – bass trombone
- Philippe Aerts – bass
- Terry Clarke – drums

Guest

- Miya Masaoka – koto

== References / external links ==
- BMG Novus J BVCJ-31003
- Monopoly Game at Allmusic.com
