= Shibuya Jazz Classics: Toshiko Akiyoshi Issue =

Compilation album by Toshiko Akiyoshi
- Released: 2006
- Recorded: 1960 ~ 1995
- Genre: Jazz
- Label: Solid Records
- Compiler: Monday Michiru

Shibuya Jazz Classics, Monday Michiru Collection, Toshiko Akiyoshi Issue is a compilation album of recordings by jazz pianist, composer, arranger and bandleader Toshiko Akiyoshi both in small combo and big band settings. The collection was compiled by Akiyoshi's daughter, Monday Michiru and released in Japan by Solid Records.

== Track listing ==
1. "Manhã de Carnaval" (from Tuttie Flutie)
2. "Let The Tape Roll" (from Dedications)
3. "Kisarazu Jinku" (from Long Yellow Road (Trio))
4. "SAIKAI" (from Fascinating Jazz)
5. "'Round Midnight" (from Night and Dream)
6. "Air" (from Yes, I Have No 4 Beat Today)
7. "Long Yellow Road" (from The Toshiko - Mariano Quartet)
8. "Kogun" (from Kogun)
9. "Haru no Umi" (from East & West)
10. "Notorious Tourist from the East" (from March of the Tadpoles)
11. "Sumi-E" (from Insights)
12. "Opus Number Zero" (from Long Yellow Road (big band))
13. "Warning: Success May Be Hazardous to your Health" (from Road Time)

== Personnel ==
- Toshiko Akiyoshi – piano
- others (see personnel listings of original albums)
