= Tribute to Duke Ellington =

Studio album by Toshiko Akiyoshi Jazz Orchestra
- Released: 1999 November 3
- Recorded: Clinton Recording Studios, New York, 1999 October 3, 4
- Genre: Jazz
- Length: 54:48
- Label: BMG / Novus-J
- Producer: Toshiko Akiyoshi, Exec. Producer: Ikuyoshi Hirakawa

Toshiko Akiyoshi Jazz Orchestra chronology
Monopoly Game (1998)	Tribute to Duke Ellington (1999)	Hiroshima - Rising from the Abyss (2001)

Tribute to Duke Ellington is a big band jazz album recorded in New York in 1999 and is the seventh recording released by the Toshiko Akiyoshi Jazz Orchestra featuring Lew Tabackin. The first three tracks make up the "Tribute To Duke Ellington Suite" which was composed by Akiyoshi and commissioned by the Monterey Jazz Festival.

== Track listing ==
All orchestrations by Toshiko Akiyoshi:

1. "Celebration of Duke's Birth" (Akiyoshi) – 9:43
2. "Eulogy" (Akiyoshi) – 10:56
3. "Duke for the Ages" (Akiyoshi) – 10:25
4. "Prelude to a Kiss" (Ellington, Mills, Gordon) – 10:47
5. "Day Dream" (Ellington, La Touche, Strayhorn) – 6:26
6. "I Let a Song Go Out of My Heart" (Ellington, Nemo, Redmond, Mills) – 6:31

== Personnel ==
- Toshiko Akiyoshi – piano
- Lew Tabackin – tenor saxophone, flute
- Tom Christensen – tenor saxophone, clarinet
- Dave Pietro – alto saxophone, flute
- Jim Snidero – alto saxophone, flute, clarinet
- Scott Robinson – baritone saxophone, alto flute, bass clarinet
- John Eckert – trumpet
- Andy Gravish – trumpet
- Michael Ponella – trumpet
- Brian Lynch – trumpet (except "Prelude to a Kiss")
- Joe Magnarelli – trumpet ("Prelude to a Kiss")
- Scott Whitfield – trombone
- Pat Hallaran – trombone
- Steve Armour – trombone
- Tim Newman – bass trombone
- Philippe Aerts – bass
- Andy Watson – drums

Guests

- Itsuro Tajima – taiko
- Hiro Sasaki – kakko

== References / external links ==
BMG Novus J BVCJ-34005
