= The World of Toshiko Akiyoshi =

Compilation album by Toshiko Akiyoshi
- Genre: Jazz
- Label: U-CAN, Inc., Japan

The World of Toshiko Akiyoshi is a Japanese boxed set compilation album of previously released tracks from Toshiko Akiyoshi recordings on the BMG (~1963 through 1999) and Nippon Crown (~1980 through 2005) Record labels.

== Track listing ==
Disk 1: Toshiko Akiyoshi – Lew Tabackin Big Band (BMG)

1. "Elegy"
2. "Memory"
3. "Kogun"
4. "Long Yellow Road"
5. "The First Night"
6. "Tales of a Courtesan (Oirantan)"
7. "Sumie"
8. "Deracinated Flower"

Disk 2: Toshiko Akiyoshi - Lew Tabackin Big Band (BMG)

1. "Strive for Jive"
2. "A-10-205932"
3. "Hangin' Loose"
4. "March of the Tadpoles"
5. "Warning: Success May Be Hazardous to Your Health"
6. "Road Time Shuffle"
7. "Minamata" (suite)
  1. "Peaceful Village"
  2. "Prosperity & Consequence"
  3. "Epilogue"

Disk 3: Toshiko Akiyoshi - Lew Tabackin Big Band & Toshiko Akiyoshi Jazz Orchestra (BMG)

1. "Elusive Dream"
2. "Salted Gingko Nuts"
3. "Son of Road Time"
4. "After Mr. Teng"
5. "Farewell (To Mingus)"
6. "Yet Another Tear"
7. "Remembering Bud"
8. "Ten Gallon Shuffle"

Disk 4: Toshiko Akiyoshi Jazz Orchestra (BMG)

"Four Seasons of Morita Village" suite:

1. "Repose"
2. "Pollination"
3. "Norito"
4. "Harvest Shuffle"

"Tribute to Duke Ellington" suite:

5. "Celebration of Duke's Birth"
6. "Eulogy"
7. "Duke for the Ages"

Disk 5: Toshiko Akiyoshi (all tracks from the BMG (Victor) recording Solo Piano)

1. "The Village"
2. "Polka Dots and Moonbeams"
3. "Plaisir d'Amour"
4. "Maple Leaf Rag"
5. "It Was a Very Good Year"
6. "Sweet and Lovely"
7. "Old Devil Moon"
8. "Sophisticated Lady"

Disk 6: Toshiko Akiyoshi & Charlie Mariano (all tracks from the BMG (Victor) recording East & West)

1. "Haru no Umi"
2. "Stone Garden of Ryoan Temple"
3. "Tonight"
4. "Something's Coming"
5. "America"
6. "Maria"
7. "Cool"

Disk 7: Toshiko Akiyoshi (Nippon Crown)

1. "Studio J"
2. "52nd St. Theme"
3. "Five Spot After Dark"
4. "Un Poco Loco"
5. "Uptown Stroll"
6. "Darn That Dream"
7. "Just One of Those Things"
8. "Jammin' at Carnegie"
9. "Tempus Fugit"
10. "Dance of the Infidels"

Disk 8: Toshiko Akiyoshi (Nippon Crown)

1. "Deep River"
2. "Dream"
3. "Pollination"
4. "Interlude"
5. "Celia"
6. "Star Eyes"
7. "I Got It Bad That Ain't So Good"
8. "I'll Keep Loving You"
9. "Time Stream"
10. "Prayer"

Disk 9: Toshiko Akiyoshi (Nippon Crown)

1. "Hope"
2. "Farewell to Mingus"
3. "Repose"
4. "Deracinated Flower"
5. "Long Yellow Road"
6. "The First Night"
7. "My Elegy"
8. "Memory"
9. "Kogun"
10. "Elusive Dream"

Disk 10: Toshiko Akiyoshi (Nippon Crown)

1. "Cleopatra's Dream"
2. "Sophisticated Lady"
3. "Con Alma"
4. "Don't Be Afraid of the Clown, the Clown's Afraid Too"
5. "Dig"
6. "Round About Midnight"
7. "Once I Loved"
8. "Lament"
9. "Central Park West"
10. "Blue Bossa"

Disk 11: Toshiko Akiyoshi (Nippon Crown)

1. "Autumn Sea"
2. "Kyoto Paradox"
3. "Tsurusaki Odori"
4. "Grooving in Yokohama"
5. "Parisian Thoroughfare"
6. "Autumn Leaves"
7. "Aria on G String"
8. "New York State of Mind"
9. "Morning of the Carnival"
10. "Travelin'"

Disk 12: Toshiko Akiyoshi (Nippon Crown)

1. "Santa Claus is Coming to Town"
2. "When You Wish Upon a Star"
3. "Get Out and Get Under the Moon"
4. "Tico Tico"
5. "Take Me Out to the Ball Game"
6. "One Note Samba"
7. "Summer Time"
8. "La Mucura"
9. "Amapola"
10. "Winter Wonderland"

== Personnel ==
- Toshiko Akiyoshi - piano
- others

== References / External links ==
- U-CAN, Inc., Japan
