= My Elegy =

Video by Toshiko Akiyoshi Jazz Orchestra
- Released: 1984
- Recorded: 1984 October 29, Kani Hoken Hall, Tokyo, Japan
- Genre: Jazz
- Length: 92 minutes
- Label: LaserDisc Corp.
- Director: Tan Ōe

Toshiko Akiyoshi Jazz Orchestra chronology
My Elegy (1984)	Strive for Jive (1985)

My Elegy is a concert video recording of the Toshiko Akiyoshi Jazz Orchestra featuring Lew Tabackin. It was released in Japan in 1984 by LaserDisc Corp. as a LaserVision video disk.

== Track listing ==
All songs composed and orchestrated by Toshiko Akiyoshi:

1. "Elegy"
2. "Remembering Bud"
3. "Autumn Sea"
4. "Fading Beauty"
5. "Long Yellow Road"
6. "Happy Hoofer"
7. "Kogun"
8. "Chasing After Love"
9. "Ten Gallon Shuffle"
10. "Jamming at KANI HOKEN Hall"

== Personnel ==
- Toshiko Akiyoshi – piano
- Lew Tabackin – tenor saxophone, flute
- Walt Weiskopf – tenor saxophone
- Frank Wess – alto saxophone
- Jim Snidero – alto saxophone
- Ed Xiques – baritone saxophone
- Joe Mosello – trumpet
- John Eckert – trumpet
- Brian Lynch – trumpet
- Chris Pasin – trumpet
- Matt Finders – trombone
- Hart Smith – trombone
- Conrad Herwig – trombone
- Chris Seiter – trombone
- Mike Formanek – bass
- Jeff Hirschfield – drums
