= Hiroshima – Rising from the Abyss =

Hiroshima - Rising From The Abyss

Live album by Toshiko Akiyoshi Jazz Orchestra
- Released: October 24, 2001
- Recorded: Hiroshima Kohsei Nenkin Kaikan, Hiroshima, Japan, 6 August 2001
- Genre: Jazz
- Length: 52:34
- Label: Videoarts Music
- Producer: Makoto Kimata, Asst. Producer: Derek Kwan, Exec. Producers: Todd Barkan, Gerald Wiggins

Toshiko Akiyoshi Jazz Orchestra chronology
Tribute to Duke Ellington (1999)	Hiroshima - Rising From The Abyss (2001)	Last Live in Blue Note Tokyo (2004)

Alternative Cover
- True Life (USA label) cover

Professional ratings
Review scores
Source	Rating
Allmusic	3/5 stars

The jazz big band album Hiroshima - Rising From The Abyss (Japanese: ヒロシマ - そして終焉から) is the eighth audio recording released by the Toshiko Akiyoshi Jazz Orchestra featuring Lew Tabackin. It was released in 2001 by Video Arts Music in Japan and True Life in the USA. Tracks 2–7 form the "Hiroshima - Rising From The Abyss" Suite.

== Track listing ==
All songs composed and orchestrated by Toshiko Akiyoshi:

1. "Long Yellow Road" – 1:53
2. "Futility – Tragedy" – 15:30
3. "Futility – Tragedy"
4. "Survivor Tales" – 21:16
5. "Survivor Tales"
6. "Survivor Tales"
7. "Hope" – 6:10
8. "Wishing Peace" – 7:45

== Personnel ==
- Toshiko Akiyoshi – piano
- Lew Tabackin – tenor saxophone, flute
- Tom Christensen – tenor saxophone, flute
- Dave Pietro – alto saxophone, flute
- Jim Snidero – alto saxophone, flute
- Scott Robinson – baritone saxophone, bass clarinet
- Mike Ponella – trumpet
- Jim O'Conner – trumpet
- John Eckert – trumpet
- Jim Rotondi – trumpet
- Scott Whitfield – trombone
- Steve Armour – trombone
- Pat Hallaran – trombone
- Tim Newman – bass trombone
- Paul Gill – bass
- Andy Watson – drums
- Valtinho – percussion

Special guests:

- George Kawaguchi – drums
- Jang-Hyun Won – traditional Korean flute (daegeum)
- Ryoko Shigemori – reading
