= Strive for Jive =

Strive For Jive

Video by Toshiko Akiyoshi Jazz Orchestra
- Released: 1993
- Recorded: 1985, Chicago
- Genre: Jazz
- Length: 48:00
- Label: V.I.E.W. Video
- Director: Arnold Rosenthal
- Producer: Yale Wexler

Toshiko Akiyoshi Jazz Orchestra chronology
My Elegy (1984)	Strive For Jive (1993)	In Shanghai (2011)

Professional ratings
Review scores
Source	Rating
Allmusic link	3.5/5 stars

The Toshiko Akiyoshi Jazz Orchestra: Strive for Jive is a live video recording of the Toshiko Akiyoshi Jazz Orchestra featuring Lew Tabackin in a jazz club setting. The video was apparently recorded in the mid 1980s in Chicago and first released on VHS video tape around 1993 and on DVD in 2009.

== Track listing ==
All songs composed and orchestrated by Toshiko Akiyoshi:

1. "Yellow Is Mellow"
2. "Strive For Jive"
3. "Quadrille, Anyone?"
4. "Autumn Sea"
5. "Warning: Success May Be Hazardous To Your Health"
6. "Strive For Jive" (Reprise)

== Personnel ==
- Toshiko Akiyoshi – piano
- Lew Tabackin – tenor saxophone, flute, piccolo
- Walt Weiskopf – tenor saxophone, soprano saxophone, clarinet, flute
- Frank Wess – alto saxophone, clarinet, flute
- Jim Snidero – alto saxophone, soprano saxophone, flute
- Ed Xiques – baritone saxophone, soprano saxophone, flute
- Brian Lynch – trumpet
- Joe Mosello – trumpet
- John Eckert – trumpet
- Chris Pasin – trumpet
- Dave Panichi – trombone
- Hart Smith – trombone
- Bruce Otter – trombone
- Matt Finders – bass trombone
- Dennis Irwin – bass
- Jeff Hirschfield – drums
