= Wishing Peace =

Studio album by Toshiko Akiyoshi Jazz Orchestra
- Released: 1986
- Recorded: July 21–22, 1986
- Studio: Atlantic Recording Studio
- Genre: Jazz
- Length: 44:29
- Label: Ken

Toshiko Akiyoshi Jazz Orchestra chronology
Ten Gallon Shuffle (1984)	Wishing Peace (1986)	Carnegie Hall Concert (1992)

Professional ratings
Review scores
Source	Rating
AllMusic	4/5 stars
The Penguin Guide to Jazz	3.5/4 stars

Wishing Peace is the second recording released by the New York–based Toshiko Akiyoshi Jazz Orchestra featuring Lew Tabackin after 13 previous releases with their Los Angeles–based Toshiko Akiyoshi – Lew Tabackin Big Band. "Lady Liberty", "Wishing Peace" and "Uptown Stroll" form the three-part "Liberty Suite" written on the occasion of the 100th anniversary of the Statue of Liberty.

== Track listing ==
All songs orchestrated by Toshiko Akiyoshi. All songs composed by Akiyoshi except "Unrequited Love" (Tabackin):

LP side A

1. "Feast in Milano" – 8:24
2. "Unrequited Love" – 11:03

LP side B

"Liberty Suite"

1. "Lady Liberty" – 8:02
2. "Wishing Peace" – 8:14
3. "Uptown Stroll" – 8:45

== Personnel ==
- Toshiko Akiyoshi – piano
- Lew Tabackin – tenor saxophone, flute, piccolo
- Walt Weiskopf – tenor saxophone, clarinet, flute
- Frank Wess – alto saxophone, soprano saxophone, flute
- Jim Snidero – alto saxophone, flute, clarinet
- Mark Lopeman – baritone saxophone, bass clarinet
- Joe Mosello – trumpet
- John Eckert – trumpet
- Brian Lynch – trumpet
- Chris Pasin – trumpet
- Hart Smith – trombone
- Conrad Herwig – trombone
- Kenny Rupp – trombone
- Matt Finders – bass trombone
- Jay Anderson – bass
- Jeff Hirschfield – drums

Guest

- Daniel Ponce – conga drums (track A1, "Feast in Milano")

== Releases ==
- Ken Music 27Ken-001
- Ascent Records ASC 1006
- Studio Songs YZSO-10030 (2013 re-issue)
