= Last Live in Blue Note Tokyo =

Live album by Toshiko Akiyoshi Jazz Orchestra
- Released: 2004
- Recorded: 28, 29 November 2003
- Venue: Blue Note Tokyo, Tokyo, Japan
- Genre: Jazz
- Length: 65:25
- Label: Warner Music Japan
- Producer: Tomonori Sato, Masato Shiotani

Toshiko Akiyoshi Jazz Orchestra chronology
Hiroshima - Rising from the Abyss (2001)	Last Live in Blue Note Tokyo (2004)	Toshiko Akiyoshi Jazz Orchestra in Shanghai (2011)

Last Live in Blue Note Tokyo is the ninth recording released by the New York–based Toshiko Akiyoshi Jazz Orchestra featuring Lew Tabackin. Not to be confused with the 1997 Toshiko Akiyoshi Trio release, Live at Blue Note Tokyo '97.

== Track listing ==
All songs orchestrated by Toshiko Akiyoshi. All songs composed by Akiyoshi except "Unrequited Love" (Tabackin).

1. "Lady Liberty" – 12:26
2. "The Village" – 12:20
3. "Unrequited Love" – 11:35
4. "Hiroko's Delight" – 13:08
5. "Chasing After Love" – 10:33
6. "Hope" – 5:21

== Personnel ==
- Toshiko Akiyoshi – piano
- Lew Tabackin – tenor saxophone, flute
- Tom Christensen – tenor saxophone, flute, soprano saxophone
- Dave Pietro – alto saxophone, flute
- Jim Snidero – alto saxophone, flute
- Scott Robinson – baritone saxophone, soprano saxophone
- Mike Ponella – trumpet
- John Eckert – trumpet
- Jim O'Conner – trumpet
- Jim Rotondi – trumpet
- Dan Levine – trombone
- Steve Armour – trombone
- Pat Hallaran – trombone
- Tim Newman – bass trombone
- Paul Gill – bass
- Andy Watson – drums

Special Guest

- Terumasa Hino – trumpet

== References / External links ==
- Warner Music Japan WPCL-10079 (japanese link)
