= Gustav Lundgren (musician) =

Swedish jazz guitarist (born 1980)

Gustav Ernest Viktor Lundgren (born 18 September 1980 in Stockholm, Sweden) is a Swedish jazz guitarist.

== Biography ==
Lundgren started playing the guitar at the age of nine and went to Södra Latin's music program during high school. He then studied music at Bollnäs folk high school and Fridhems folk high school in Svalöv.

After finishing his studies, he joined the Hot Club de Suede and started a jazz club at Hannas Krog at Södermalm in Stockholm.

He participates in several music projects, including his own Gustav Lundgren Quartet, and plays mostly jazz and bossa nova.

Gustav Lundgren has been working with names like: Chris Cheek, Jimmy Rosenberg, Jorge Rossy, Antoine Boyer, Anne Sofie von Otter, Bill McHenry, Lelo Nika, Swedish House Mafia, Marian Petrescu, Rasmus Faber, Doug Weiss, Rick Margitza & Kleerup.

He runs his own record company, Lundgren Music AB.

== Honors ==
- 2004: Honored with his own signature guitar model from AJL-Guitars
- 2005: Recipient of the Louis Armstrong Scholarship
- 2009: Honored with a grant from The Swedish Arts Grants Committee

== Discography ==
=== Solo albums ===
- 2004: First Impression (Lundgren Music), with Gustav Lundgren Quartet/Quintet
- 2007: Second Opinion (Lundgren Music), with Gustav Lundgren Quartet
- 2010: 8 Venues (Lundgren Music), with Gustav Lundgren Quartet
- 2012: Plays Django Reinhardt (Lundgren Music)
- 2014: French Connection (Lundgren Music)
- 2015: Bertheleville (Lundgren Music), with Gustav Lundgren Trio
- 2017: At The Movies (Lundgren Music), with Gustav Lundgren & Unit
- 2018: What´s New? (Lundgren Music), with Leo Lindberg and Moussa Fadera
- 2019: Ballad for Bill (Lundgren Music), with Jorge Rossy, Chris Cheek and Tom Warburton
- 2023: French Connection vol.2 (Lundgren Music AB), with Antoine Boyer etc
- 2023: 2021 (Lundgren Music AB), with Pär-Ola Landin and Karl-Henrik Ousbäck
- 2024: Stockholm (Lundgren Music AB), with Jorge Rossy, Doug Weiss and Bill McHenry
- 2024: Once a Year (Prisma), with Gustav Lundgren Quartet
- 2025: Live at Jamboree (Lundgren Music AB), with Jorge Rossy and Camil Arcarazo
- 2025: Sunbeam (Prisma), with Gustav Lundgren Quartet
- 2025: This Is Now (Lundgren Music AB), with Gustav Lundgren Quartet

=== Collaborations ===
- 2002: 29m² (SJR), with Mozaique
- 2003: Avec (SJR), with Hot Club de Suede
- 2005: Django Project vol. 1 (Lundgren Music), with Anders Larsson
- 2008: Django Project vol. 2 (Lundgren Music), with Anders Larsson
- 2011: Take Two (Lundgren Music), with Stockholm Swing All Stars
- 2012: Janeiro (Lundgren Music), with Daniel Santiago
- 2012: Barcelona / Estocolmo (Lundgren Music), with Fredrik Carlquist
- 2013: Plays Richard Rodgers (Lundgren Music), with Trio Legacy
- 2013: Bossa Nova vol. 1 (Lundgren Music), with Fredrik Carlquist
- 2014: Passageiros (Lundgren Music), with Lili Araujo
- 2014: Cruce de Caminos (Lundgren Music), with Celia Mur
- 2015 : Mar (Lundgren Music), with Luiz Murá
- 2017: Jazz Vol. 1 (Lundgren Music), with Jorge Rossy and Doug Weiss
- 2017: Acoustic Connection LIVE (Lundgren Music), with Antoine Boyer
