= Ten Gallon Shuffle =

Studio album by Toshiko Akiyoshi Jazz Orchestra
- Released: 1984
- Recorded: Mad Hatter Studio, Los Angeles, California, 24–25 May 1984
- Genre: Jazz
- Length: 49:58
- Label: BMG Victor / Baystate / Ascent

Toshiko Akiyoshi Jazz Orchestra chronology
| Ten Gallon Shuffle (1984) | Wishing Peace (1986) |

Toshiko Akiyoshi – Lew Tabackin Big Band chronology
| European Memoirs (1982) | - | - |

Professional ratings
Review scores
| Source | Rating |
|---|---|
| Allmusic link | 4/5 stars |

Ten Gallon Shuffle is the first recording released by the New York–based Toshiko Akiyoshi Jazz Orchestra featuring Lew Tabackin (following 13 previous releases by the Los Angeles–based Toshiko Akiyoshi – Lew Tabackin Big Band). The composition Ten Gallon Shuffle was originally commissioned by Phi Mu Alpha Sinfonia Music Fraternity for the University of Texas Jazz Orchestra.

== Track listing ==
All songs composed and arranged by Toshiko Akiyoshi:

LP side A

1. "Ten Gallon Shuffle" – 5:14
2. "Fading Beauty" – 7:22
3. "Jamming at Carnegie Hall" – 9:51

LP side B

1. "Blue Dream" – 15:57
2. "Happy Hoofer" – 8:35

== Personnel ==
- Toshiko Akiyoshi – piano
- Lew Tabackin – tenor saxophone, flute
- Walt Weiskopf – tenor saxophone, soprano saxophone, clarinet
- Frank Wess – alto saxophone, soprano saxophone, flute
- Jim Snidero – alto saxophone, flute, clarinet
- Ed Xiques – baritone saxophone, soprano saxophone, bass clarinet
- Joe Mosello – trumpet
- John Eckert – trumpet
- Brian Lynch – trumpet
- Chris Albert – trumpet
- Hart Smith – trombone
- Chris Seiter – trombone
- Conrad Herwig – trombone
- Phil Teele – bass trombone
- Mike Formanek – bass
- Scott Robinson – drums

== References / External Links ==
- Victor (Japan) Records (Baystate) RVC RJL 8098
- Ascent Records ASC 1004
- Allmusic
