= From Toshiko with Love =

From Toshiko With Love

Studio album by Toshiko Akiyoshi – Lew Tabackin Big Band
- Released: 1981
- Recorded: Devonshire Sound Studios, Los Angeles, California, March 24–25 and April 20, 1981
- Genre: Jazz
- Length: 39:15
- Label: Victor (Japan), JAM (U.S.)
- Producer: Toshiko Akiyoshi and Lew Tabackin

Toshiko Akiyoshi – Lew Tabackin Big Band chronology
Farewell (1980)	From Toshiko With Love (1981)	European Memoirs (1982)

Alternative cover / title
- JAM (U.S.) LP cover

Professional ratings
Review scores
Source	Rating
Allmusic link	4/5 stars
The Rolling Stone Jazz Record Guide	4/5 stars

From Toshiko With Love is the twelfth recording released by the Toshiko Akiyoshi – Lew Tabackin Big Band (ninth studio recording). It was released in Japan by Victor Records and in the U.S. (under the title Tanuki's Night Out) by Jazz America Marketing – not to be confused with the 2002 Lew Tabackin Trio recording of the same name (Tanuki's Night Out). The album received two Grammy Award nominations in 1981 for "Best Jazz Instrumental Performance - Big Band" and "Best Arrangement of an Instrumental Recording" (for the song "A Bit Byas'd").

== Track listing ==
All songs composed by Lew Tabackin and arranged by Toshiko Akiyoshi:

LP side A

1. "A Bit Byas'd" – 7:29
2. "Lament for Sonny" – 5:11
3. "Let the Tape Roll" (a.k.a. "Lew's Theme") – 7:30

LP side B

1. "Tanuki's Night Out" – 7:40
2. "Falling Petal" – 8:36
3. "Yet Another Tear" – 2:49

note: Side A and Side B designations are reversed on the JAM Records LP release, Tanuki's Night Out

== Personnel ==
- Toshiko Akiyoshi – piano
- Lew Tabackin – tenor saxophone and flute
- John Gross – tenor saxophone
- Dan Higgins – alto saxophone (except on "Let the Tape Roll")
- Gary Foster – alto saxophone (on "Let the Tape Roll")
- Bob Sheppard – alto saxophone
- Bill Byrne – baritone saxophone
- Buddy Childers – trumpet
- Steve Huffsteter – trumpet
- Larry Ford – trumpet and piccolo trumpet
- Mike Price – trumpet (except on "Let the Tape Roll")
- Richard Cooper – trumpet (on "Let the Tape Roll")
- Jim Sawyer – trombone
- Hart Smith – trombone
- Bruce Fowler – trombone
- Phil Teele – bass trombone
- Edward Bennett – bass
- Steve Haughton – drums

== References / External Links ==
- RCA Victor (Japan) Records RVC RJL-8016
- JAM (Jazz America Marketing) JAM 006
- Allmusic
- 1981 Grammy nominations, Best Jazz Instrumental Performance - Big Band and (for "A Bit Byas'd") Best Arrangement of an Instrumental Recording (LA Times link)
