= Big Band (Joe Henderson album) =

1997 studio album by Joe Henderson

Studio album by Joe Henderson
- Released: 1997
- Recorded: March 16, 1992; June 24 & 26, 1996
- Genre: Jazz
- Length: 60:05
- Label: Verve
- Producer: Richard Seidel, Joe Henderson, Bob Belden, Don Sickler

Joe Henderson chronology
Double Rainbow: The Music of Antonio Carlos Jobim (1995)	Big Band (1997)	Porgy & Bess (1997)

Professional ratings
Review scores
Source	Rating
AllMusic	4/5 stars
The Penguin Guide to Jazz Recordings	3.5/4 stars

Big Band is a 1997 album by the jazz saxophonist Joe Henderson, the fourth of the five albums he recorded with Verve Records at the end of his career. As the title suggests, it contains arrangements for a full big band.

== Track listing ==
All tracks are composed by Joe Henderson, except where noted.

1. "Without a Song" (Vincent Youmans, Billy Rose, Edward Eliscu) – 5:24
2. "Isotope" – 5:20
3. "Inner Urge" – 9:01
4. "Black Narcissus" – 6:53
5. "A Shade Of Jade" – 8:22
6. "Step Lightly" – 7:19
7. "Serenity" – 5:52
8. "Chelsea Bridge" (Billy Strayhorn) – 4:30
9. "Recordame (Recuerdame)" – 7:25

== Personnel ==
- Joe Henderson – tenor saxophone, arranger (tracks 1, 2, 5, 8)
- Slide Hampton – conductor, arranger (tracks 3, 7)
- Dick Oatts – soprano saxophone, alto saxophone
- Pete Yellin, Steve Wilson, Bobby Porcelli, John O'Gallagher – alto saxophone
- Craig Handy, Rich Perry, Tim Ries, Charles Pillow – tenor saxophone
- Joe Temperley, Gary Smulyan – baritone saxophone
- Freddie Hubbard (tracks 4–5), Raymond Vega, Idrees Sulieman, Jimmy Owens, Jon Faddis, Lew Soloff, Marcus Belgrave, Nicholas Payton (tracks 6, 9), Tony Kadleck, Michael Mossman, Virgil Jones, Earl Gardner, Byron Stripling – trumpet
- Conrad Herwig, Jimmy Knepper, Robin Eubanks, Keith O'Quinn, Larry Farrell, Kiane Zawadi – trombone
- David Taylor, Douglas Purviance – bass trombone
- Chick Corea (tracks 2–4, 6–7), Helio Alves (track 9), Ronnie Mathews (tracks 1, 5, 8) – piano
- Christian McBride – bass
- Joe Chambers, Al Foster, Lewis Nash, Paulo Braga – drums
- Michael Mossman – arranger (track 9)
- Bob Belden – arranger (tracks 4, 6)
- Richard Seidel, Don Sickler – producers
