= Ken Music =

Japanese record label (1989–1992)

Ken Music was a jazz record label based in Japan that distributed CDs in Japan, Germany, North America, and Great Britain. The company was founded by Kenichi (Ken) Fujiwara in 1989 as a subsidiary of Matsuka USA, which, among other things, manufactured industrial robotic sewing systems for car seat manufacturers. The label functioned from 1989 to 1992.

== Ken artists ==
- Conrad Herwig
- Walt Weiskopf (1959)
- Peter Leitch (born 1944)
- Gust William Tsilis (born 1956)
- Jim Snidero
- Dave Stryker
- Axel Grube
- Stan Kenton
- Salvatore Bonafede
- Grover Mitchell
- Ron McClure
- Brian Lynch
- Renee Manning
- Toshiko Akiyoshi
- Ted Rosenthal
- Phil Markowitz
- Fabio Morgera
- Eiji Nakayama
- Joanne Brackeen
- Eddie Gómez
- Jack DeJohnette

== Leadership ==
Executive producer

Kenichi Fujiwara was originally from Tamano, south of Okayama, and was an avid jazz fan who had worked as a bandboy for the Count Basie Orchestra on Japanese tours. He met trombonist Conrad Herwig on a tour of Japan with Toshiko Akiyoshi in the mid-1980s and became of fan of soloists such as Herwig, Jim Snidero, and Brian Lynch. Fujiwara wanted to produce and engineer recordings, relocating to New York City to do so. Originally an employee of Matsuka Industries in Japan, Fujiwara used this relationship to launch his own Ken Music label. His office at 301 West 57th Street, Suite 26A, Manhattan, New York City, was, at the time, the Matsuka USA headquarters.

Other producers

Gust Tsilis (Gust William Tsilis; born 1956) worked for Ken Music, where he produced over 40 CDs.

== Matsuka USA Inc. ==
Matsuka USA incorporated in the state of New York on November 1, 1989, and changed its name on November 21, 2001, to Upright Enterprises Incorporated. Upright, which was headed by Akira Matsuka with agent Mieko M. Ajiro, registered as a foreign corporation in California on February 28, 1995, and kept its corporate domicile in New York. As of 2012, its California foreign registration was forfeited, although it is an active corporation in New York.

== Foreign distribution ==
Fujiwara had a distribution agreement with Bellaphon Records in Germany, which gave Ken artists a stronger presence in Germany and all of Europe.

== Reissues ==
Ken Music also reissued recordings for labels, including SeaBreeze.
