= Night and Dream =

Studio album by Toshiko Akiyoshi
- Released: 1994
- Recorded: 19, 20, 23, 24 June 1994
- Genre: Jazz
- Length: 58:02
- Label: Nippon Crown Records

Toshiko Akiyoshi chronology
Toshiko Akiyoshi at Maybeck (1994)	Night and Dream (1994)	Yes, I Have No 4 Beat Today (1995)

Professional ratings
Review scores
Source	Rating
Allmusic link	4/5 stars

Night and Dream is a small jazz combo album recorded by pianist Toshiko Akiyoshi in 1994 and released by Nippon Crown Records.

== Track listing ==
1. "Night Waltz" (Akiyoshi) – 6:16
2. "Darn That Dream" (DeLange, Van Heusen) – 8:24
3. "Elusive Dream" (Akiyoshi) – 7:26
4. "Get Out and Get Under the Moon" (Jerome, Shay, Tobias) – 8:35
5. "When You Wish upon a Star" (Harline, Washington) – 6:23
6. "Dream" (Mercer) – 6:09
7. "The Night Has a Thousand Eyes" (Bernier, Brainin) – 8:18
8. "Round About Midnight" (Hanighen, Monk, Williams) – 6:31

== Personnel ==
- Toshiko Akiyoshi – piano
- Mickey Roker – drums
- Peter Washington – bass
- Joe Magnarelli – trumpet, flugelhorn (tracks 1, 2, 3, 6, 7)
- Walt Weiskopf – tenor saxophone (tracks 1, 2, 3, 6, 7)
- Scott Robinson – alto saxophone, baritone saxophone, bass clarinet (tracks 1, 2, 3, 4, 6)
