= Blue Note Tokyo =

Jazz venue in Tokyo

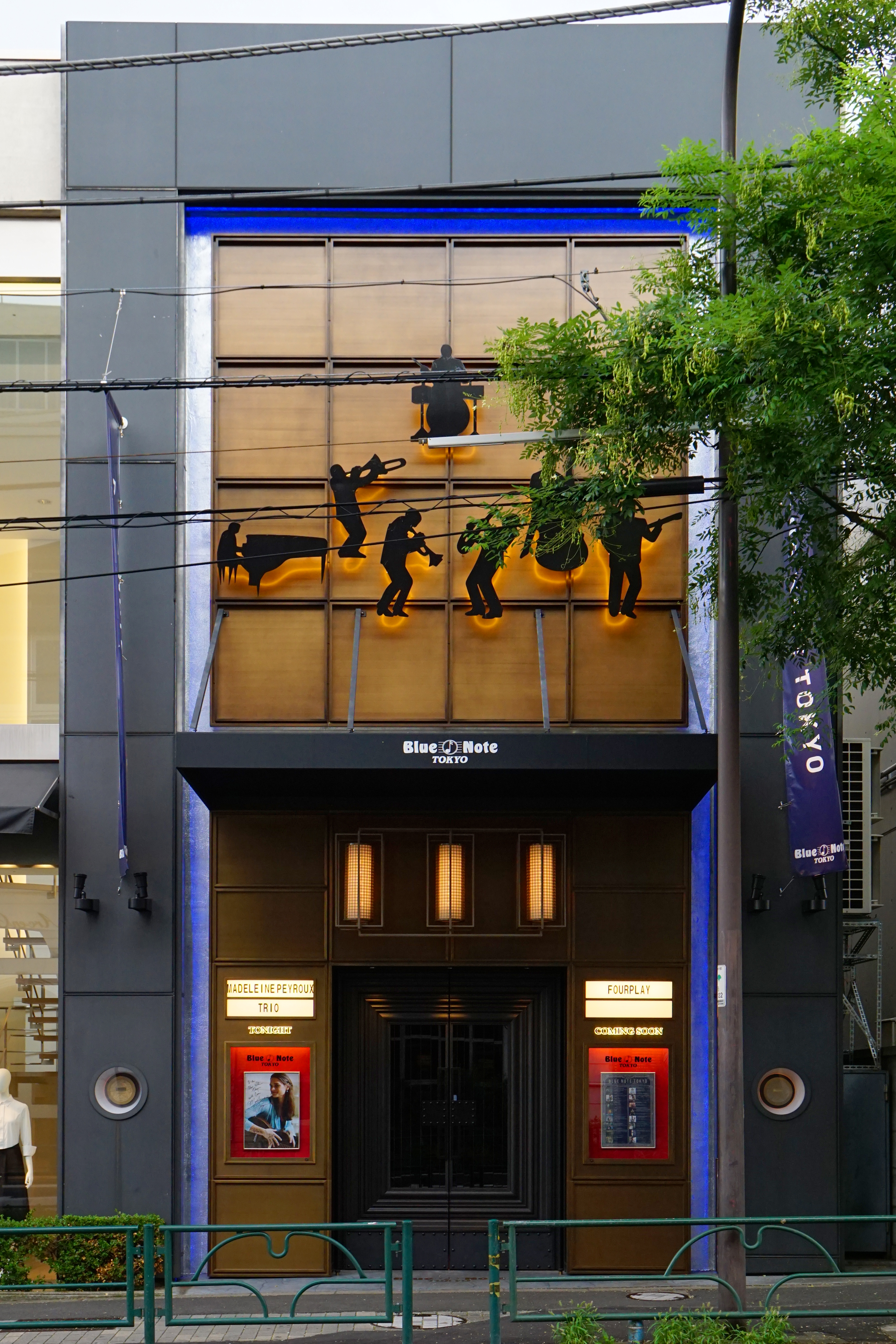
- Exterior in 2015
- Interactive map of Blue Note Tokyo
- Location: Aoyama, Tokyo, Japan
- Coordinates: 35°39′40″N 139°42′58″E

Construction
- Opened: November 26, 1988

Website
- bluenotejapan.jp/brands/bluenotetokyo/

Blue Note Tokyo (Japanese: ブルーノート東京) is a jazz venue in Aoyama, Tokyo, Japan. It is a branch of Blue Note Jazz Club in New York and located about 400 metres east of the Aoyama Gakuin University. It has been described as Tokyo's best venue for live jazz.

It was established on 26 November 1988 and seats about 300 people. Over the years it has hosted jazz musicians such as Sarah Vaughan, Koji Tamaki, Tony Bennett, Roberta Flack, Chick Corea, Oscar Peterson, Maceo Parker, Soulive, Dr. John, David Sanborn, the Milt Jackson Quartet, Enrico Rava, Stefano Bollani, the Jim Hall Quartet, and the Kyle Eastwood band; As well as the legendary Phyllis Hyman. Toshiko Akiyoshi has released several albums that were recorded in the club, such as Last Live in Blue Note Tokyo and Toshiko Akiyoshi Trio Live at Blue Note Tokyo '97.
