= Bandboy =

Bandboy (also expressed as band boy) is a bygone term for a job similar to for what now is known as a "roadie." They set up, tear down, and maintain equipment, and music. They help out backstage with tasks such as making sure that towels, drinks, and ice are available.

Unlike a roadie, the bandboy was more like a personal assistant, or au pair, or butler/dresser for the leader — making sure suits were dry cleaned, shoes shined, and the like. On foreign tours a local bandboy would translate, find places to eat, change money, buy train tickets, and perform similar tasks. Often the bandboy would disseminate information for the leader, hand out itineraries, room lists, and set lists. The role of bandboy was different with every band and had different duties than the more senior road manager, who dealt with promoters, booking agents, contracts, payroll, and catering. When times got tough financially, road managers or band members themselves often performed bandboy duties.

== Notable bandboy alumni ==
- Simon Napier-Bell
- Popsie Randolph, Benny Goodman
- George A. "Bullets" Durgom (1915–1992), Tommy Dorsey
- Morris I. (Moishe) Diamond (born 1921), Tommy Dorsey: 1940–1942
- Nifty Vickerson, Frank Sinatra
- Henry Snodgrass, Count Basie
- Willie Bobo, Machito's Afro-Cubans: 1947
- Fred Charap, Count Basie
- Jimmy Thomason (born 1919), Cliff Bruner
- Coke Escovedo, Tito Puente
- Ken Fujiwara, Count Basie, Japan tour: 1980s
- Bob "Little Gate" Walker, Bunny Berigan
- Bernard Arthurneal (Bernie) Mackey (1909–1980), Bunny Berigan
- Edward F. Gabel (1924–2014), Stan Kenton (left Kenton as bandboy to work for Earle Spencer as manager in 1947)

== See also ==
- Road crew
