= Sixth Floor Jazz =

Studio album by the University of Texas Jazz Orchestra
- Released: 1997
- Recorded: The University of Texas, Bates Recital Hall; Austin, Texas
- Genre: Jazz, big band, instrumental
- Length: 57:06
- Label: UTJO
- Producer: Rick Lawn

The University of Texas Jazz Orchestra chronology
Loose Ends (1990)	Sixth Floor Jazz (1997)	Once in a Blue Moon (2000)

Audio sample
- "M Fred Romp": file; help

Sixth Floor Jazz is a 1997 CD release by the University of Texas Jazz Orchestra; it was critically acclaimed by All About Jazz. The recording also features Gunther Schuller conducting and giving commentary to historic works of Duke Ellington and Charlie Barnet during a live concert in 1995. The CD is unique in featuring Enhanced CD audio and QuickTime video with credits and pictures for the recording sessions.

== Background ==
This group that comprised the University of Texas Jazz Orchestra (during this time) is noted as one of the top collegiate jazz orchestras in the country having been invited to play at the 1997 International Association for Jazz Education Convention in Chicago. The group heard on this recording also played and recorded with Charlie Haden and Gunther Schuller and performed the commission Ten Gallon Shuffle composed by Toshiko Akiyoshi. Several members of the group have moved into teaching positions at major universities around the country and others are now established jazz artists.

== Reception ==
"...Sixth Floor Jazz redeems the promise shown in that earlier scrapbook...A first–class session by an upwardly mobile university–level Jazz ensemble..."

Jack Bowers, All About Jazz

Professional ratings
Review scores
Source	Rating
All About Jazz	Very good

== Track listing ==
All tracks are written by various artists listed.

No.	Title	Length
1.	"The More I See You (Harry Warren, arr. Jack Cooper)"	5:49
2.	"M Fred Romp (Greg Kehl Moore)"	7:07
3.	"Unknown Soldiers (Rick Lawn)"	8:29
4.	"Sophisticated Lady (Duke Ellington, arr. Jack Cooper)"	6:53
5.	"A Nod To Cee-Cee (Benjamin Irom)"	7:29
6.	"Coffee With Caffey (Paul De Castro)"	8:19
7.	"Pleasingly Plump (William 'Count' Basie)"	4:12
8.	"Gunther Schuller talking about Duke Ellington"	2:48
9.	"Daybreak Express (Duke Ellington)"	3:37
10.	"Gunther Schuller talking about Charlie Barnet"	2:02
11.	"Gulf Coast Blues (Charlie Barnet)"	3:47
Total length:		57:06

== Recording Sessions ==
- recorded live and in studio, 1995-1996, The University Of Texas, Austin, Texas

== Personnel ==
=== Musicians ===
- Conductors: Rick Lawn, Jeff Hellmer, Gunther Schuller
- Guest artist: Mitch Watkins (guitar)
- Saxes and woodwinds: Paul Haar, Tommy Poole, Joey Colarusso, Ray Rideout, Mace Hibbard, Colin Mason, Jack Cooper, Greg Kehl Moore, Dylan Russell, Paul White, John Mills.
- Trumpets and flugelhorns: Glenda Smith, Craig Biondi, Billy Hunter, Rick White, Wayne Tice
- Trombones: Brenda Sansig, Jerome Smith, Mike Hoffer, (Gary Smith on Daybreak Express and Gulf Coast Blues)
- Guitar: Dave Burdick
- Piano: Paul DeCastro
- Bass: Tom Mahalik
- Drums: Mike Koenning, Eric Middleton, Steve Summer

=== Production ===
- Recording, mixing, editing, mastering engineers: Andy Murphy, Rick Lawn, Jeff Hellmer
- Liner notes: Rick Lawn
- Album design: Jodi Jenkins
