= Time Stream (Toshiko Akiyoshi Trio album) =

Toshiko Akiyoshi Trio

Studio album by Toshiko Akiyoshi
- Released: 1984
- Recorded: 23, 24 June 1984
- Venue: New York City
- Genre: Jazz
- Length: 36:17
- Label: Toshiba East World
- Producer: Toshiko Akiyoshi

Toshiko Akiyoshi chronology
Toshiko Akiyoshi Trio (1983)	Toshiko Akiyoshi Trio (1984)	Interlude (1987)

Time Stream is a jazz trio album recorded by pianist Toshiko Akiyoshi in New York in 1984. It was released on the Toshiba East World record label. This album is not to be confused with the 1996 Nippon Crown release, Time Stream: Toshiko Plays Toshiko.

== Track listing ==
LP side A

1. "Prosperity" (Akiyoshi) – 5:09
2. "Con Alma" (Gillespie) – 6:20
3. "Giant Steps" (Coltrane) – 6:22

LP side B

1. "Smile" (Chaplin, Turner, Parsons) – 6:26
2. "Time Stream" (Akiyoshi) – 6:31
3. "Tico Tico" (de Abreu, Oliveira, Drake) – 5:29

== Personnel ==
- Toshiko Akiyoshi – piano
- George Mraz – bass
- Arthur Taylor – drums
