= Peter Zak =

American jazz pianist and composer (born 1965)

- Born: May 13, 1965 (age 60); Los Angeles, California, U.S.
- Genres: Jazz
- Occupations: Musician, composer
- Instrument: Piano
- Years active: Late 1980s–present
- Website: peterzakmusic.com

Peter Zak (born May 13, 1965) is an American jazz pianist and composer.

== Life and career ==
Zak grew up in Ohio. He studied classical piano between the ages of six and 20. He moved to Oakland, California with his parents at the age of 16. He studied history at the University of California, Berkeley, by the end of which he had local jazz gigs. He moved to New York City in 1989. There, he played with mainstream musicians including Eric Alexander, Peter Bernstein, Joe Farnsworth, and Ryan Kisor. Zak began recording for SteepleChase Records in 2004.

Zak's playing was influenced by McCoy Tyner and Cedar Walton.

== Discography ==
An asterisk (*) indicates that the year is that of release.

=== As leader/co-leader ===
Year recorded	Title	Label	Personnel/Notes
1989*	More Than Love	Giana	
1991*	Purple Refrain	Giana	
2004	Peter Zak Trio	SteepleChase	Trio, with Paul Gill (bass), Al Foster (drums)
2005	For Tomorrow	SteepleChase	Trio, with Paul Gill (bass), Willie Jones, III (drums)
2007	My Conception	SteepleChase	Solo piano
2007	Seed of Sin	SteepleChase	Trio, with Paul Gill (bass), Quincy Davis (drums)
2007	Blues on the Corner: The Music of McCoy Tyner	SteepleChase	Trio, with Paul Gill (bass), Quincy Davis (drums)
2009	The Decider	SteepleChase	Quartet, with Walt Weiskopf (tenor sax, soprano sax), Ugonna Okegwo (bass), Billy Drummond (drums)
2010	Down East	SteepleChase	Trio, with Peter Washington (bass), Rodney Green (drums)
2011	Nordic Noon	SteepleChase	Trio, with Peter Washington (bass), Billy Drummond (drums)
2012	The Eternal Triangle	SteepleChase	Trio, with Peter Washington (bass), Billy Drummond (drums)
2013	The Disciple	SteepleChase	Trio, with Peter Washington (bass), Willie Jones, III (drums)
2014	Standards	SteepleChase	Trio, with Jay Anderson (bass), Billy Drummond (drums)
2017	One Mind	Fresh Sounds	Quartet, with Seamus Blake (tenor sax), Marcos Varela (bass), Billy Drummond (drums)

=== As sideman ===
Year recorded	Leader	Title	Label
1998	Ryan Kisor	The Usual Suspects	Fable
1998	Ryan Kisor	Point of Arrival	Criss Cross
2001	Ryan Kisor	The Dream	Criss Cross
