= Interlude (Toshiko Akiyoshi album) =

Studio album by Toshiko Akiyoshi
- Released: 1987
- Recorded: February 1987
- Venue: Coast Recorders, San Francisco
- Genre: Jazz
- Length: 40:06
- Label: Concord Jazz
- Producer: Carl E. Jefferson

Toshiko Akiyoshi chronology
Time Stream (1984)	Interlude (1987)	Four Seasons (1990)

Professional ratings
Review scores
Source	Rating
AllMusic	4.5/5 stars

Interlude is a jazz trio album recorded by pianist Toshiko Akiyoshi in San Francisco in 1987. It was released on the Concord Jazz record label.

== Track listing ==
LP side A

1. "Interlude" (Akiyoshi) – 4:37
2. "I Know Who Loves You" (Akiyoshi) – 4:54
3. "Blue and Sentimental" (Basie, Livingston, David) – 4:49
4. "I Ain't Gonna Ask No More" (Akiyoshi) – 5:35

LP side B

1. "Pagliacci" (Puccini) – 4:43
2. "Solitude" (Ellington, DeLange, Mills) – 5:34
3. "So in Love" (Porter) – 4:41
4. "You Stepped Out of a Dream" (Kahn, Brown) – 4:13

== Personnel ==
- Toshiko Akiyoshi – piano
- Dennis Irwin – bass
- Eddie Marshall – drums
