= Porgy & Bess (Joe Henderson album) =

Studio album by Joe Henderson
- Released: September 16, 1997
- Recorded: May 25–28, 1997
- Studio: Avatar, New York
- Genre: Jazz
- Length: 53:46
- Label: Verve Records
- Producer: Richard Seidel, Joe Henderson

Joe Henderson chronology
Big Band (1997)	Porgy & Bess (1997)

Professional ratings
Review scores
Source	Rating
AllMusic	4/5 stars
The Penguin Guide to Jazz Recordings	3/4 stars

Porgy & Bess is a 1997 album by the jazz saxophonist Joe Henderson, released on Verve Records. It contains Henderson's arrangements of music from George Gershwin's opera Porgy and Bess. It was his final album as a leader.

== Track listing ==
All music is by George Gershwin and all lyrics by Ira Gershwin and DuBose Heyward unless otherwise noted.

1. "Introduction: Jasbo Brown Blues" – 0:56
2. "Summertime" – 7:16
3. "Here Come de Honey Man/They Pass by Singin'" – 2:04
4. "My Man's Gone Now" – 6:58
5. "I Got Plenty o' Nuttin' " – 6:52
6. "Bess, You Is My Woman Now" – 5:15
7. "It Ain't Necessarily So" (G. Gershwin, I. Gershwin) – 6:27
8. "I Loves You, Porgy" – 4:18
9. "There's a Boat Dat's Leavin' Soon for New York" – 6:42
10. "Oh Bess, Oh Where's My Bess?" – 6:58

== Personnel ==
- Joe Henderson – tenor saxophone
- Conrad Herwig – trombone
- John Scofield – acoustic and electric guitars
- Stefon Harris – vibes
- Tommy Flanagan – piano
- Dave Holland – bass
- Jack DeJohnette – drums
- Chaka Khan – vocals on track 2
- Sting – vocals on track 7
