= Four Seasons (Toshiko Akiyoshi Trio album) =

Studio album by Toshiko Akiyoshi
- Released: 1990
- Recorded: 1990 June
- Studio: Van Gelder Studio Englewood Cliffs, NJ
- Genre: Jazz
- Length: 49:29
- Label: Nippon Crown
- Producer: Toshiko Akiyoshi, Fumimaru Kawashima

Toshiko Akiyoshi chronology
Interlude (1987)	Four Seasons (1990)	Remembering Bud: Cleopatra's Dream (1990)

Professional ratings
Review scores
Source	Rating
Allmusic link	4.5/5 stars

Four Seasons is a jazz album recorded by the Toshiko Akiyoshi Trio in 1990 and released on the Nippon Crown record label. It is not to be confused with the 1996 Toshiko Akiyoshi Jazz Orchestra (BMG) recording, Four Seasons of Morita Village.

== Track listing ==
1. "Spring Is Here" (Rodgers, Hart) – 6:56
2. "Suddenly it is Spring" (Van Heusen) – 6:21
3. "Summertime" (Gershwin, Heyward) – 5:00
4. "Indian Summer" (Herbert, Dubin) – 6:15
5. "Autumn Sea" (Akiyoshi) – 6:43
6. "Autumn Leaves" (Kosma, Prévert, Mercer) – 5:17
7. "Winter Wonderland" (Bernard, Smith) – 3:39
8. "Santa Claus Is Coming to Town" (Coots, Gillespie) – 5:11
9. "Springtime for Hitler" (Brooks) – 4:07

== Personnel ==
- Toshiko Akiyoshi – piano
- George Mraz – bass
- Lewis Nash – drums
