= Toshiko Akiyoshi at Maybeck =

Live album by Toshiko Akiyoshi
- Released: 10 July 1994
- Recorded: March 1993
- Venue: Maybeck Recital Hall, Berkeley, California
- Genre: Jazz
- Length: 58:12
- Label: Concord Jazz
- Producer: Carl Jefferson

Toshiko Akiyoshi chronology
Dig (1993)	Toshiko Akiyoshi at Maybeck (1994)	Night and Dream (1994)

Toshiko Akiyoshi at Maybeck is a solo jazz piano album recorded by Toshiko Akiyoshi at the Maybeck Recital Hall in Berkeley, California and released on the Concord Jazz record label. It is Volume 36 in Concord's "Maybeck Recital Hall Series".

== Reception ==
Professional ratings
Review scores
Source	Rating
AllMusic	4/5 stars
The Penguin Guide to Jazz on CD	3.5/4 stars
The Rolling Stone Jazz & Blues Album Guide	4/5 stars

In a review for AllMusic, Richard S. Ginell called the recording "one of the more individual solo albums in the Maybeck series," and stated that Akiyoshi "has her own distinct ideas" and "is especially compelling when her hands fly off in multiple directions."

== Track listing ==
1. "Village" (Akiyoshi) – 5:59
2. "Come Sunday" (Ellington) – 4:37
3. "Con Alma" (Gillespie) – 5:28
4. "Polka Dots and Moonbeams" (Burke, Van Heusen) – 7:02
5. "It Was a Very Good Year" (Drake) – 5:34
6. "Things We Did Last Summer" (Cahn, Styne) – 7:44
7. "Old Devil Moon" (Harburg, Lane) – 6:04
8. "Sophisticated Lady" (Ellington, Mills, Parish) – 6:09
9. "Quadrille, Anyone?" (Akiyoshi) – 5:45
10. "Tempus Fugit" (Powell) – 3:50
