= Man of Many Colors =

Man Of Many Colors

Studio album by Walt Weiskopf
- Released: 2002
- Recorded: December 12, 2001 in Brooklyn, New York
- Genre: Jazz
- Length: 51:06
- Label: Criss Cross

Walt Weiskopf chronology
Siren (2000)	Man Of Many Colors (2002)	Sight to Sound (2004)

Man of Many Colors is an album by saxophonist Walt Weiskopf.

== Background ==
This was Weiskopf's first quartet album since A World Away, in 1995. This was his seventh release for Criss Cross Jazz.

== Music and recording ==
The album was recorded on December 12, 2001, in Brooklyn, New York. Six of the tracks are Weiskopf originals. "Triangle Dance" is played in 6/4 time. The final track, "When Your Lips Meet Mine", is a duet with pianist Brad Mehldau.

== Reception ==
An AllAboutJazz reviewer commented that "Weiskopf and crew approach things in a manner that makes this so much more than yet another mainstream recital".

Professional ratings
Review scores
Source	Rating
AllMusic	4/5 stars
The Penguin Guide to Jazz Recordings	3.5/4 stars

== Track listing ==
1. "Triangle Dance" (Weiskopf) – 7:22
2. "Haunted Heart" (Arthur Schwartz, Howard Dietz) – 7:36
3. "Together" (Weiskopf) – 5:45
4. "Man of Many Colors" (Weiskopf) – 7:08
5. "People" (Jule Styne) – 7:26
6. "NYC" (Weiskopf) – 6:51
7. "Petal" (Weiskopf) – 5:37
8. "When Your Lips Meet Mine" (Weiskopf) – 3:15

== Personnel ==
- Walt Weiskopf – tenor sax
- Brad Mehldau – piano
- John Patitucci – bass
- Clarence Penn – drums
