= Tippin' =

Studio album by Jim Snidero
- Released: October 23, 2007
- Recorded: May 31, 2007
- Studio: Van Gelder Studio, Englewood Cliffs, NJ
- Genre: Jazz
- Length: 51:57
- Label: Savant; SCD 2086
- Producer: Don Sickler, Jim Snidero

Jim Snidero chronology
Close Up (2004)	Tippin' (2007)	Crossfire (2009)

Tippin' is an album by saxophonist Jim Snidero which was recorded in 2007 and released on the Savant label.

== Reception ==
Professional ratings
Review scores
Source	Rating
Allmusic	4/5 stars
The Penguin Guide to Jazz Recordings	3/4 stars

In his review on Allmusic, Scott Yanow states "After nearly a quarter-century of other musical experiences, he sat in with his friend, organist Mike LeDonne, in 2006 and enjoyed returning to the basic blues, ballads and standards. Their 2007 recording features Snidero playing more boppish and a bit more basic than one might expect, perfectly fitting into the idiom. He caresses the melodies of ballads and brings out the bluish side of the faster tunes". In JazzTimes, Mike Shanley wrote "Alto saxophonist Jim Snidero’s beefy tone and fleet attack evokes Cannonball Adderley in many places on Tippin' . At the same time, Snidero takes these comparisons and places them in a context that contrasts with Adderley’s setting of choice: the organ trio" On All About Jazz, John Barron called it " a spirited session of burners, ballads and blues" stating "There's nothing startling about Tippin' . It's just hip, swinging music performed exceptionally well. Snidero and crew leave a soulful impression".

== Track listing ==
All compositions by Jim Snidero except where noted

1. "Tippin'" – 5:15
2. "Let's Be Frank (Dedicated to Frank Wess)" – 5:41
3. "Young Like" (Mike LeDonne) – 6:39
4. "The More I See You" (Harry Warren, Mack Gordon) – 5:46
5. "Lover Man (Oh, Where Can You Be?)" (Jimmy Davis, Ram Ramirez, James Sherman) – 5:28
6. "You Stepped out of a Dream" (Nacio Herb Brown, Gus Kahn) – 4:28
7. "K2" – 6:32
8. "Alone Together" (Arthur Schwartz, Howard Dietz) – 7:00
9. "Fried Oysters" – 5:08

== Personnel ==
- Jim Snidero – alto saxophone
- Mike LeDonne – Hammond B3
- Paul Bollenback – guitar
- Tony Reedus – drums
