= Sketches of Japan =

Studio album by Toshiko Akiyoshi
- Released: 1999
- Recorded: 12, 13 January 1998 and 8 February 1999 (New York); 17 November 1998 (Tokyo)
- Studio: Studio A, Avatar Studios, New York City; CRS Recording Studio No. 1, Tokyo
- Genre: Jazz
- Length: 49:32
- Label: Nippon Crown

Toshiko Akiyoshi chronology
Live at Blue Note Tokyo '97 (1997)	Sketches of Japan (1999)	Solo Live at the Kennedy Center (2000)

Professional ratings
Review scores
Source	Rating
AllMusic	4/5 stars

Sketches of Japan is an album by jazz pianist Toshiko Akiyoshi. It was released in 1999 by Nippon Crown Records.

== Recording and music ==
The album was recorded over three sessions: at Studio A, Avatar Studios, New York City on January 12–13 and February 8, 1999; and at CRS Recording Studio No. 1, Tokyo on November 17, 1998. Most of the music is played by a trio, and five of the seven tracks were written by Akiyoshi.

== Track listing ==
1. "Kyoto Paradox" - 6:24
2. "Children In The Temple Ground" - 8:44
3. "Tsurusaki Odori" - 6:33
4. "Mari To Tonosama" - 6:14
5. "Repose" - 8:19
6. "Prayer" - 6:44
7. "Grooving in Yokohama" - 6:34

== Personnel ==
- Toshiko Akiyoshi – piano
- Philippe Aerts – bass
- Eddie Marshall – drums (except Track 7)
- Carl Allen – drums (Track 6)
- Tomonao Hara – trumpet (Track 7)
- Jō Yamada – alto saxophone (Track 7)
