= European Memoirs =

Studio album by Toshiko Akiyoshi – Lew Tabackin Big Band
- Released: 1982
- Recorded: Madhatter Studio, Los Angeles, California, September 21–22, 1982
- Genre: Jazz
- Length: 41:23
- Label: Victor (Japan) / Ascent (US)
- Producer: Toshiko Akiyoshi and Lew Tabackin

Toshiko Akiyoshi – Lew Tabackin Big Band chronology
From Toshiko with Love (1981)	European Memoirs (1982)	-

Toshiko Akiyoshi Jazz Orchestra chronology
-	-	Ten Gallon Shuffle (1984)

Alternative cover
- Ascent Label cover

Professional ratings
Review scores
Source	Rating
Allmusic link	4/5 stars

European Memoirs (a.k.a. Memoir in Japan) is the tenth studio recording of the Toshiko Akiyoshi – Lew Tabackin Big Band. Akiyoshi was nominated for a 1983 Grammy award in the Best Instrumental Arrangement category for the arrangement of "Remembering Bud" on this album. This would be the final recording of the Los Angeles-based Toshiko Akiyoshi – Lew Tabackin Big Band before the principals moved to New York City in 1982 and formed a new big band, the "Toshiko Akiyoshi Jazz Orchestra featuring Lew Tabackin" that released nine more albums and two live performance videos before disbanding in 2003.

== Track listing ==
All songs composed and arranged by Toshiko Akiyoshi:

LP side A

1. "Remembering Bud" – 8:55
2. "Feast in Milano" – 4:50
3. "Relaxing at Zell am See" – 8:14

LP side B

1. "Two Faces of a Nation"
  1. Part 1 – 9:22
  2. Part 2 – 10:02

== Personnel ==
- Toshiko Akiyoshi – piano
- Lew Tabackin – tenor saxophone, flute, piccolo
- John Gross – tenor saxophone, flute, clarinet
- Matt Catingub – alto saxophone, soprano saxophone, flute, clarinet
- Bob Sheppard – alto saxophone, soprano saxophone, flute
- Bill Byrne – baritone saxophone, soprano saxophone, bass clarinet, alto flute
- Buddy Childers – trumpet
- Larry Ford – trumpet
- Steven Huffsteter – trumpet
- Mike Price – trumpet
- Hart Smith – trombone
- Dave Bowman – trombone
- Bruce Fowler – trombone
- Phil Teele – bass trombone
- Bob Bowman – bass
- Joey Baron – drums

Other

- Anonymous – voice (on "Two Faces of a Nation," Part 1)

== References / External links ==
- RCA Victor (Japan) Records RVC RJL-8036
- Ascent Records ASC 1003
- Allmusic
- LA Times 1983 Grammy award nominations
