= Remembering Bud: Cleopatra's Dream =

Studio album by Toshiko Akiyoshi
- Released: 1990
- Recorded: 31 July and 1 August 1990
- Studio: Van Gelder Studio, Englewood Cliffs, NJ
- Genre: Jazz
- Length: 56:34
- Label: Nippon Crown / Evidence

Toshiko Akiyoshi chronology
Four Seasons (1990)	Remembering Bud: Cleopatra's Dream (1990)	Chic Lady (1991)

Professional ratings
Review scores
Source	Rating
Allmusic link	3/5 stars
The Penguin Guide to Jazz Recordings	3.5/4 stars

Remembering Bud: Cleopatra's Dream is a jazz trio album recorded by pianist Toshiko Akiyoshi in 1990 as a tribute to jazz pianist Bud Powell and released on the Nippon Crown record label in Japan and on the Evidence label in the USA.

== Track listing ==
all compositions by Bud Powell except as noted:

1. "Cleopatra's Dream" – 6:29
2. "Remembering Bud" (Akiyoshi) – 9:27
3. "Un Poco Loco" – 6:10
4. "Oblivion" – 4:56
5. "Celia" – 6:43
6. "I'll Keep Loving You" –6:08
7. "Parisian Thoroughfare" – 4:55
8. "Budo" (Davis, Powell) – 3:59
9. "Tempus Fugit" – 4:12
10. "Dance of the Infidels" – 3:35

== Personnel ==
- Toshiko Akiyoshi – piano
- George Mraz – bass (Tracks 2~7, 10)
- Ray Drummond – bass (Tracks 1, 8, 9)
- Lewis Nash – drums
- Al Harewood – drums

== References / External Links ==
- Nippon Crown PAS 1007, Nippon Crown CRCJ-91003
- Evidence 22034
- All Music Guide

Specific
