= Akiko Tsuruga =

Japanese jazz organist (1967–2025)

Akiko Tsuruga 敦賀明子
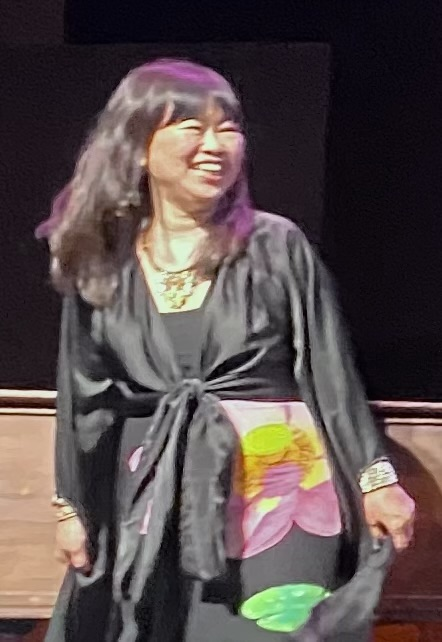
- Tsuruga in 2024

Background information
- Born: 1 September 1967; Osaka, Kansai, Japan
- Died: 13 September 2025 (aged 58) Brooklyn, New York, U.S.
- Genres: Jazz
- Occupation: Musician
- Instrument: Organ
- Years active: 2000s–2025
- Spouse: Joe Magnarelli
- Education: Osaka College of Music

Akiko Tsuruga (敦賀明子, Tsuruga Akiko; 1 September 1967 – 13 September 2025) was a Japanese jazz organist, pianist, and composer from Osaka.

== Biography ==
Tsuruga was born in Osaka on 1 September 1967, the oldest of the three children of Hiroko Tsuruga (née Kiyonaga) and Koji Tsuruga. Her parents bought her a small organ when she was three, and she started learning to play standards. In high school, she listened to Hammond B3 players, including Jimmy Smith, Charles Earland, Jack McDuff, Jimmy McGriff, and Dr. Lonnie Smith.

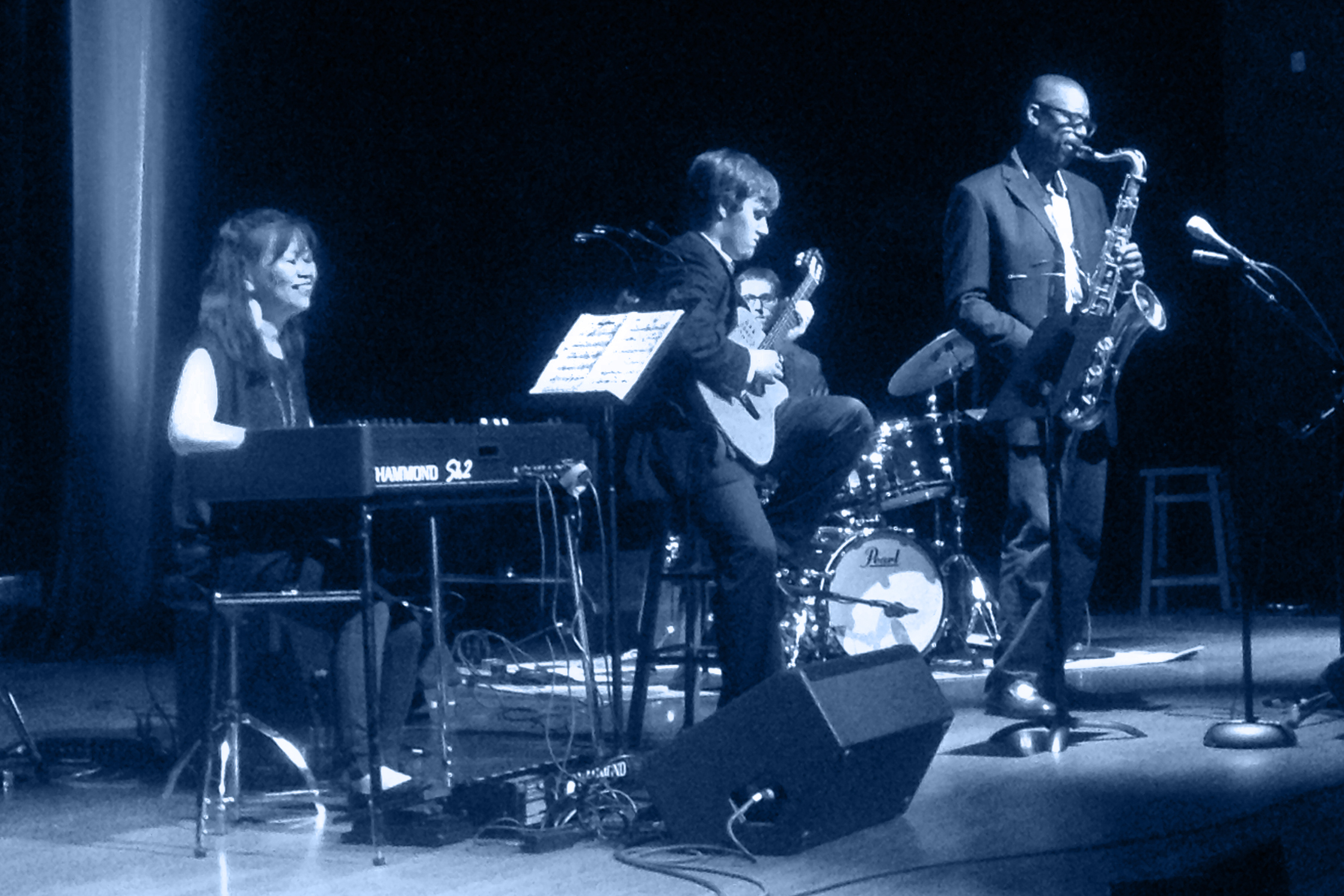
Tsuruga with the Paul Carr Quartet at the Bethesda Theatre, Maryland, 2013

A 1988 graduate of the Osaka College of Music, she moved to New York City in 2001, after which she began taking lessons from Dr. Lonnie Smith.

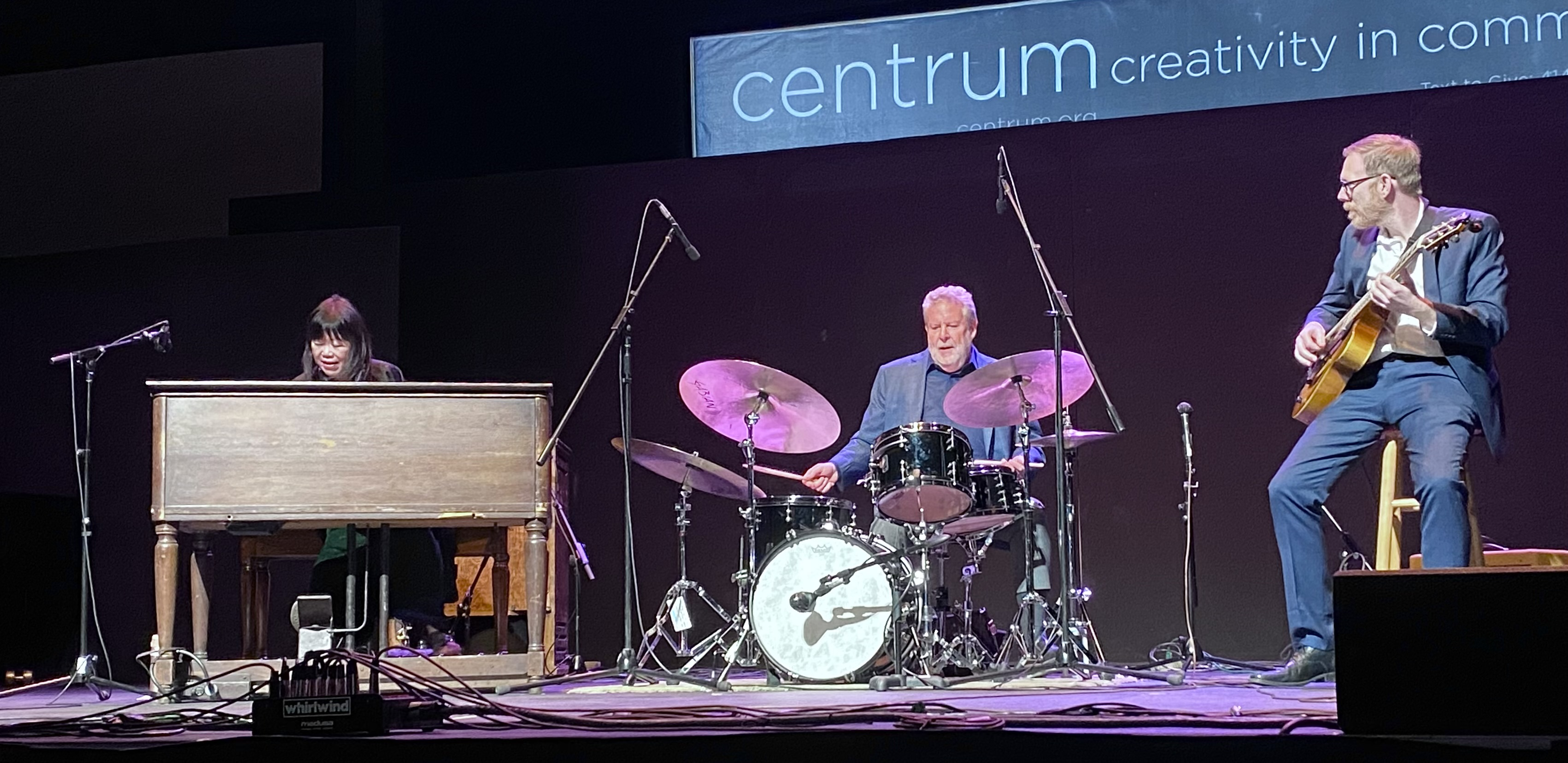
Tsuruga with drummer Jeff Hamilton and guitarist Steve Kovalcheck at the Jazz Port Townsend festival, July 2024

In addition to her solo work, she played as a sideman in various groups in New York. She had accompanied alto saxophonist Lou Donaldson since 2007.

Tsuruga died on 13 September, 2025, in Brooklyn, New York, at the age of 58. According to her husband, trumpeter Joe Magnarelli, Tsuruga died after a short period of terminal illness. She is survived by her mother, two brothers, and husband.

== Discography ==
Recording date	Title	Label	Release year	Notes / Personnel
—	Harlem Dreams	M&I Jazz (MYCJ-30264)	2006	Tsuruga (Hammond B3 organ), Frank Wess (alto saxophone, tenor saxophone), Satoshi Inoue (guitar), Grady Tate (drums)
10 August 2006	Sweet and Funky	18th & Vine (18V 1052; US) / M&I (MYCJ30405; Japan)	2007	Tsuruga (Hammond B3 organ), Eric Johnson (guitar), Vince Ector (drums), Wilson "Chembo" Corniel (percussion)
6 May & 11 June 2007	St. Louis Blues	Mojo (XQCM-1302; Japan)	2007	Tsuruga (Hammond B3 organ), Houston Person (tenor saxophone), Eric Johnson (guitar), Bernard Purdie (drums), Vince Ector (drums)
31 May & 1 June 2008	NYC Serenade	Mojo (XQCM-1313; Japan)	2008	With Jimmy Cobb
28 & 29 April 2008	Oriental Express	18th & Vine (18V 1057; US)	2009	Tsuruga (Hammond B3 organ), Jerry Weldon (tenor saxophone), Eric Johnson (guitar), Rudy Petschauer (drums), Wilson "Chembo" Corniel (percussion)
19 & 20 April 2011	Sakura	American Showplace Music (ASM-5089; US)	2011	Tsuruga (Hammond B3 organ), Joe Magnarelli (trumpet, flugelhorn), Jerry Weldon (tenor saxophone), Bob DeVos (guitar), Rudy Petschauer (drums)
—	Commencement	AT (ATM 1001; US) / Somethin' Cool (DIW) (SCOL 1004; Japan)	2014	Tsuruga (Hammond B3 organ), John Hart (guitar), Jeff Hamilton (drums)
—	Pelham Parkway	Kevin Golden Productions	2016	As Kevin Golden Trio; Kevin Golden (guitar), Tsuruga (Hammond B3 organ), Peter Grant (drums)
22 January 2017	So Cute, So Bad	AT (ATM 1002; US) / Somethin' Cool (DIW) (SCOL 1019; Japan)	2017	Tsuruga (Hammond B3 organ), Graham Dechter (guitar), Jeff Hamilton (drums)
—	Equal Time	Capri (CAP 74160; US)	2019	Tsuruga (organ), Jeff Hamilton (drums), Graham Dechter (guitar)
—	Pride & Joy	Posi-Tone (PR8193)	2019	With Lioness (all-female group); Alexa Tarantino (alto saxophone), Jenny Hill (tenor saxophone), Lauren Sevian (baritone saxophone), Tsuruga (organ), Amanda Monaco (guitar), Allison Miller (drums)
February 2023	Beyond Nostalgia	SteepleChase (SCCD 31956)	2024	Tsuruga (Hammond B3 organ), Joe Magnarelli (trumpet), Jerry Weldon (tenor saxophone), Ed Cherry (guitar), Byron Landham (drums)
—	Coast to Coast	R.M.I. (RMICD10202)	2025	As the Jeff Hamilton Organ Trio; Steve Kovalcheck (guitar), Tsuruga (organ), Jeff Hamilton (drums)

- "—" denotes unknown dates.

== See also ==
- Hammond organ
- Organ trio
