= Chic Lady =

Studio album by Toshiko Akiyoshi
- Released: 1991
- Recorded: 15, 16 November 1991
- Genre: Jazz
- Length: 43:34
- Label: Nippon Crown
- Producer: Toshiko Akiyoshi

Toshiko Akiyoshi chronology
Remembering Bud: Cleopatra's Dream (1990)	Chic Lady (1991)	Dig (1993)

Chic Lady is a jazz album recorded by American musician Toshiko Akiyoshi in 1991 and released on the Nippon Crown record label.

== Track listing ==
1. "My Elegy" (Akiyoshi) – 6:15
2. "Travelin'" (Lewis) – 4:09
3. "Sophisticated Lady" (Ellington) – 6:01
4. "Chic Lady" (Akiyoshi) – 7:30
5. "Don't be Afraid, The Clown's Afraid Too" (Mingus) – 5:18
6. "Lady Liberty" (Akiyoshi) – 4:16
7. "Blue Bossa" (Dorham) – 5:01
8. "No Due Blues" (Tabackin) – 5:04

== Personnel ==
- Toshiko Akiyoshi – piano
- Lewis Nash – drums
- Peter Washington – bass
- John Eckert – trumpet, flugelhorn
- Scott Robinson – alto saxophone, baritone saxophone
- Walt Weiskopf – tenor saxophone (Tracks 2, 3, 6, 8)
- Matt Finders – trombone, bass trombone, tuba (Tracks 1, 4, 5, 7)

== References / External Links ==
- Nippon Crown CRCJ-91004
- jazzdisco.org
