= Antoine Bohier Du Prat =

French cardinal

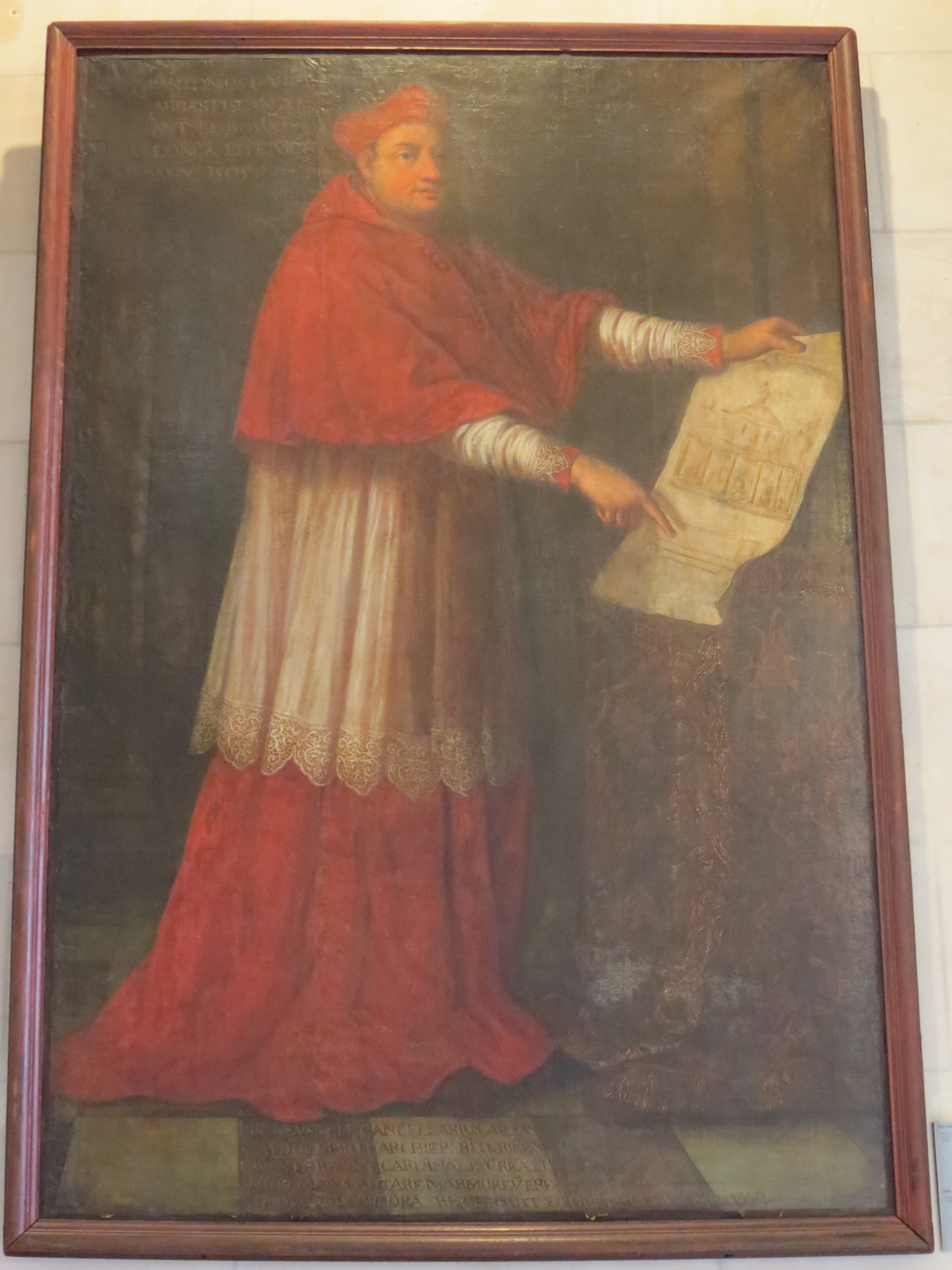

Antoine Bohier Du Prat (c. 1460 – 27 November 1519) was a French Roman Catholic bishop and cardinal.

== Biography ==
Antoine Bohier Du Prat was born in Issoire, ca. 1460, the son of Austremoine Bohier, baron of Saint-Ciergues, and Anne Du Prat. He was the cousin of Cardinal Antoine Duprat.

He entered the Order of Saint Benedict at Fécamp Abbey. There, he was ordained as a priest. He became a president of the Parlement of Rouen.

He resisted being raised to the episcopate until the queen mother of France, Louise of Savoy, personally entreated him. After he agreed, on 13 November 1514, he was elected Archbishop of Bourges. On 22 November 1514 he was granted permission to wear the Religious habit of a secular archbishop rather than the habit of the Benedictine Order. He was Archbishop of Bourges until his death.

Pope Leo X made him a cardinal priest in the consistory of 1 April 1517. On 27 April 1517, he was granted permission to wear a cardinal's habit instead of the habit of his order. He received the red hat and the titular church of Sant'Anastasia on 25 May 1517.

He died at the court of Francis I of France at Blois, on 27 November 1519. He was buried in Bourges Cathedral.
