= Time Stream: Toshiko Plays Toshiko =

Studio album by Toshiko Akiyoshi
- Released: 1996
- Recorded: 15, 16 October 1996
- Genre: Jazz
- Length: 60:18
- Label: Nippon Crown Records

Toshiko Akiyoshi chronology
Yes, I Have No 4 Beat Today (1995)	Time Stream: Toshiko Plays Toshiko (1996)	Live at Blue Note Tokyo '97 (1997)

Alternate Packaging
- CD in slipcase (box) with obi strip

Time Stream: Toshiko Plays Toshiko is a small jazz combo album by pianist Toshiko Akiyoshi playing her own compositions. It was recorded in 1996 and released by Nippon Crown Records. This recording is not to be confused with the 1984 Toshiko Akiyoshi Trio recording, Time Stream or the 1979 Toshiko Akiyoshi Quartet (Discomate) recording, Toshiko Plays Toshiko.

== Track listing ==
All songs composed by Toshiko Akiyoshi:

1. "Long Yellow Road" – 7:16
2. "Memory" – 7:27
3. "Kogun" – 7:15
4. "Interlude" – 5:24
5. "Studio J" – 5:10
6. "Farewell To Mingus" – 8:41
7. "Deracinated Flower" – 7:35
8. "First Night" – 4:56
9. "Jammin' At Carnegie Hall" – 3:58
10. "Time Stream" – 2:36

== Personnel ==
- Toshiko Akiyoshi – piano
- George Mraz – bass
- Lewis Nash – drums
- Lew Tabackin – tenor saxophone, flute (Tracks 3, 6, 8, 9)

== References / External Links ==
- Nippon Crown CRCJ-9137, CRCJ-91008
- Time Stream: Toshiko Plays Toshiko at Allmusic.com
