= Solo Piano (Toshiko Akiyoshi album) =

Solo Piano (Toshiko Akiyoshi)

Studio album by Toshiko Akiyoshi
- Released: 1971
- Recorded: 27 March 1971, 4 April 1971
- Venue: Tokyo
- Studio: Victor Studios, Tokyo
- Genre: Jazz
- Length: 45:41
- Label: RCA Victor

Toshiko Akiyoshi chronology
Sumie / The Personal Aspect in Jazz (1971)	Solo Piano (Toshiko Akiyoshi) (1971)	Dedications (1976)

Solo Piano is a solo album recorded by jazz pianist Toshiko Akiyoshi in Tokyo in late March / early April 1971 and released in the United States on RCA Victor.

== Track listing ==
LP side A

1. "The Village" (Akiyoshi) – 7:35
2. "Polka Dots and Moonbeams" (Burke, Van Heusen) – 8:08
3. "Plaisir d'Amour" (Martini) – 4:03
4. "Maple Leaf Rag" (Joplin) – 2:25

LP side B

1. "It Was a Very Good Year" (Drake) – 4:23
2. "Sweet and Lovely" (Arnheim, Tobias, LeMare) – 6:27
3. "Old Devil Moon" (Harburg, Lane) – 5:29
4. "Sophisticated Lady" (Ellington, Parish, Mills) – 7:11

== Sources ==
- RCA Victor RVC RCA-6270
