= Larry Ford =

American gynaecologist

Larry Creed Ford Sr. (September 29, 1950 – March 2, 2000) was a biomedical researcher and gynaecologist from Irvine, California, United States who was suspected of conspiring to murder his business partner, James Patrick Riley and subsequently found to have stored lethal biological toxins in his home and office.

== Death ==
On February 28, 2000, Ford's business partner at Biofem, Inc., James Patrick Riley, was shot and wounded by a masked gunman at the company's office near the Irvine Spectrum. The company had been working on a suppository microbicide that worked as a contraceptive and also claimed to prevent AIDS. Police quickly discovered that the driver of the gunman's getaway van, Dino D'Saachs, made a phone call to Ford the morning of the attack. Prosecutors alleged Ford was behind the attempted murder.

Following police questioning on March 2, Ford committed suicide with a shotgun at his Woodbridge home. His suicide note claimed he was innocent of the attempted murder, but added that there was information hidden in the house of interest to the police. When authorities searched the home, they discovered containers buried next to his swimming pool containing assault rifles and C-4 plastic explosives. In refrigerator at his home, were 266 bottles and vials of pathogens. Among them were the bacterial agents of Clostridium tetani and Clostridioides difficile. According to the Orange County's Health Officer, the microorganisms were found in extremely poor condition, though they stated there was no evidence to suggest that these materials were being used to prepare a biological weapon, and neither of these bacteria are on the Centers for Disease Control and Prevention (CDC) list of possible bioterrorism agents. In later reporting it was alleged that the materials identified, and the risks they represented, may have been based on only a limited sample of the materials uncovered.

Some 83 files with medical records and personal items taken by Ford from his female patients were found under floorboards. Shane Gregory who was Ford's mistress until she became ill and Tami Tippit (a set stylist) who became ill after a single business lunch with Ford. Ford went on to brag to others how he had infected them with various diseases.

City officials closed an elementary school and evacuated 250 local residents in the immediate area while they performed a thorough search of Ford's home.

== Shooting of Ford ==
Around 1978, Ford was shot in a UCLA parking lot. The only bullet that hit him was deflected by dictaphone tapes in his pocket. Ford was unwilling to talk to the police about the event and only told his family soon before his death.

== South African biological warfare ==
After Ford killed himself, a number of newspapers alleged that he and Riley had ties with biological warfare development in apartheid-era South Africa. Ford was also linked to Daniel Knobel, former chief medical officer for the South African Defence Force, and Wouter Basson, former head of the country's secret chemical and biological warfare project.
