= Yes, I Have No 4 Beat Today =

Studio album by Toshiko Akiyoshi
- Released: 1995
- Recorded: 2, 3 August 1995
- Studio: Power Station Studio B, New York
- Genre: Jazz
- Length: 52:01
- Label: Nippon Crown Records
- Producer: Toshiko Akiyoshi

Toshiko Akiyoshi chronology
Night and Dream (1994)	Yes, I Have No 4 Beat Today (1995)	Time Stream: Toshiko Plays Toshiko (1996)

Professional ratings
Review scores
Source	Rating
Allmusic link	4/5 stars

Yes, I Have No 4 Beat Today - Toshiko Akiyoshi with Brazilian Friends is a jazz album recorded by pianist Toshiko Akiyoshi in 1995 and released by Nippon Crown Records.

== Track listing ==
1. "Once I Loved" (Jobim) – 8:42
2. "Pollination" (Akiyoshi) – 7:22
3. "Tico Tico" (Abreu, Drake, Oliveira) – 3:33
4. "Air" (Bach) – 6:18
5. "One Note Samba" (Jobim) – 5:57
6. "Star Eyes" (Raye, De Paul) – 8:17
7. "Amapola" (LaCalle, Roldan, Gamse) – 5:30
8. "Warning, Success May Be Hazardous To Your Health" (Akiyoshi) – 6:22

== Personnel ==
- Toshiko Akiyoshi – piano
- Lincoln Goines – bass
- Duduka da Fonseca – drums
- Valtinho Anastacio – percussion
- Ivo Araujo – percussion (surdo, chocalho, repinique)
- Scott Wendholdt – trumpet
- Scott Whitfield – trombone
- Ray Stewart – tuba
- Lew Tabackin – flute (Track 8)
- Roberta Cooper – cello
