= Toshiko Akiyoshi Trio Live at Blue Note Tokyo '97 =

Toshiko Akiyoshi Trio - Live at Blue Note Tokyo '97

Live album by Toshiko Akiyoshi
- Released: 1997
- Recorded: 22, 23, 24 September 1997
- Venue: Blue Note Tokyo
- Genre: Jazz
- Length: 61:42
- Label: Nippon Crown Records

Toshiko Akiyoshi chronology
Time Stream: Toshiko Plays Toshiko (1996)	Toshiko Akiyoshi Trio - Live at Blue Note Tokyo '97 (1997)	Sketches of Japan (1999)

Toshiko Akiyoshi Trio featuring Motohiko Hino - Live at Blue Note Tokyo '97 is a jazz trio album recorded by pianist Toshiko Akiyoshi featuring drummer Motohiko Hino. It was recorded in 1997 in the Tokyo Blue Note club and was released by Nippon Crown Records.

== Track listing ==
1. "Long Yellow Road" (Akiyoshi)
2. "Count Your Blessings Instead of Sheep" (Berlin)
3. "Un Poco Loco" (Powell)
4. "Sophisticated Lady" (Ellington)
5. "I Know Who Loves You" (Akiyoshi)
6. "When You Wish upon a Star" (Harline, Washington)
7. "Chic Lady" (Akiyoshi)

== Personnel ==
- Toshiko Akiyoshi – piano
- Yoshio Suzuki – bass
- Motohiko Hino – drums
