= Dedications (Toshiko Akiyoshi Trio album) =

Dedications (Toshiko Akiyoshi Trio)

Studio album by Toshiko Akiyoshi
- Released: 1976
- Recorded: 19, 20, 21 July 1976
- Venue: Hollywood, CA
- Studio: Sage and Sound Recording Studio
- Genre: Jazz
- Length: 39:30
- Label: Discomate
- Producer: Toshiko Akiyoshi

Toshiko Akiyoshi chronology
Solo Piano (1971)	Dedications (Toshiko Akiyoshi Trio) (1976)	Dedications II (1977)

Alternative Cover
- Alfa Records CD cover

Professional ratings
Review scores
Source	Rating
DownBeat	4.5/5 stars

The jazz trio album Dedications was recorded by pianist Toshiko Akiyoshi in Los Angeles in July 1976 and was released by Discomate Records in Japan. This recording is not to be confused with the 1977 Inner City Records (USA) release of the same name, Dedications, which was also released by Discomate in Japan, but under the title Dedications II.

== Reception ==
DownBeat awarded 4.5 stars and reviewer Pete Welding wrote, "These are subtle, thoughtful performances that grow in power the more, and more closely, one listens to them. If, as I did, you will play this record often, you’ll be more than amply repaid for your time and efforts; you'll probably come to love it, for it wears very well indeed".

== Track listing ==
There are 4 tracks on both sides

LP side A

1. "I Let a Song Go Out of My Heart" (Ellington) – 4:21
2. "Miss Blue Eyes" (Mariano) – 5:45
3. "Django" (Lewis) – 6:05
4. "Rio" (Feather) – 3:53

LP side B

1. "Wind" (Watanabe) – 6:01
2. "Reets and I" (Harris) – 4:42
3. "Don't Be Afraid, The Clown's Afraid Too" (Mingus) – 5:34
4. "Let The Tape Roll" (Tabackin) – 3:09

== Personnel ==
- Toshiko Akiyoshi – piano
- Jimmie Smith – drums
- Gene Cherico – bass
