= Doug Weiss =

American ice hockey player

- Born: 1965 (age 60–61) Greenfield, MA, USA
- Height: 5 ft 11 in (180 cm)
- Weight: 190 lb (86 kg; 13 st 8 lb)
- Position: Right wing
- Shot: Left
- Played for: Indianapolis Ice; Johnstown Chiefs; Olomouc HC; Odense Bulldogs; Springfield Indians
- National team: United States
- NHL draft: undrafted
- Playing career: 1988–1993

Douglass Weiss (born circa 1965) is an American retired professional ice hockey player.

== Career ==
Weiss played 100 games with Dartmouth College, where he captained the Big Green during the 1987–88 season, Weiss' senior year. Weiss joined the Springfield Indians after the Big Green completed the season, scoring one goal in his only game with the team. Weiss returned to the Indians during the 1988-89 AHL season, scoring fourteen points in thirty-two games.

Weiss joined the Johnstown Chiefs for the 1989-90 ECHL season and scored a career-high 19 goals in 40 games, which was the fourth highest total on the team despite only playing a fraction of the games.

In 1991, Weiss was a member of the United States select team and attended 1991 Olympic training camp. After completion of camp, Weiss became the first American to play in the Czechoslovak National League as a member of HC Olomouc. Weiss played seven games with HC Olomouc but did not record any points.

Weiss returned to the Chiefs for the 1991–92 ECHL season and recorded a career high in points, scoring 44 points in 61 games. It was also the first time that Weiss played in the post-season, reaching the second round and playing in five games.

The following season, Weiss joined the Odense Bulldogs of Denmark's Superisligaen as a player-coach.

== Personal ==
After the completion of his hockey career, Weiss returned to Dartmouth to finish his master's degree in health policy and volunteered as an assistant coach for one season in 1995–96.

Weiss is currently the team orthopedic physician for the United States U-18 hockey team
