= Jim Snidero =

American jazz saxophonist (born 1958)

James J. Snidero (born May 29, 1958, in Redwood City, California, United States) is an American jazz saxophonist.

== Performance career ==
Snidero grew up in the Washington, D.C., area (Camp Springs, MD), studying with Jim Murphy, Ron Diehl, Tim Eyerman and Phil Woods, then studied at the U of North Texas, where he played in the One OClock Lab band from 1979-1981. He moved to New York City in 1981, studied with Dave Liebman, recorded and toured with Jack McDuff from 1981 to 1982, then joined Toshiko Akiyoshi's Jazz Orchestra in 1983 after Akiyoshi moved to New York. Snidero was a working member of Frank Sinatra's band from 1991 to 1995 including the album "Duets II" and Eddie Palmieri's band beginning 1994. Snidero also has performed with the Frank Wess Sextet (1985), the Mingus Big Band from 1996 to 2000, and Walt Weiskopf from 1994 to 2003. He has worked as a sideman for David Hazeltine, David Murray, Mike LeDonne, Joe Magnarelli, Maria Schneider, Mel Lewis, Jim Rotondi, Brian Lynch, Conrad Herwig, and Tom Varner.

In 1984 he formed his own quintet and recorded and performed with sidemen that includes trumpeters Brian Lynch, Tom Harrell (from 1989 to 1992), and Tim Hagans (from 1992 to 1995); the pianists Benny Green (from 1987 to 1991), and Mulgrew Miller (in 1991); the double bass players Peter Washington and Dennis Irwin; and the drummers Billy Hart (from 1984 to 1986, and again in 1989), Louis Hayes (in 1990), Gene Jackson (in 1993), and Adam Nussbaum (from 1996). From 2001 to 2004, he recorded for Milestone Records, including composing and arranging for a string ensemble. In 2007, Snidero was signed with the Highnote/Savant label, and has recorded over 15 leader dates with sidemen that include Dave Douglas, Kurt Rosenwinkel, Orrin Evans, Jeremy Pelt, Linda May Han Oh, Andy LaVerne, Paul Bollenback, Rudy Royston, Kurt Rosenwinkel, Peter Washington and Joe Farnsworth. His "Live at the Deer Head" recording received 5 stars in Downbeat Magazine.

Snidero was awarded two National Endowment for the Arts grants, including one recording with Dave Holland and Jack Dejohnette (1987), and has placed multiple times in both Downbeat Magazine critics and readers polls, including Top 5 alto saxophonists, critics poll (2024).

Snidero performs frequently in the US, Europe, Japan and toured Australia in 2002.

== Educator career ==
Snidero is an adjunct instructor at the Jazz and Contemporary Music Program at the New School University and was a visiting professor at Indiana University and Princeton University. He has written five series of jazz etude books (60 in total editions) keyed to play-along CDs. He also has produced courses in jazz improvisation and performance for The Jazz Conception Company.

- Jazz Conception: 21 solo etudes for jazz phrasing, interpretation and improvisation (1996)
- Easy Jazz Conception: 15 solo etudes for jazz phrasing, interpretation and improvisation (1999)
- Intermediate Jazz Conception: 15 solo etudes for jazz phrasing, interpretation and improvisation (2003)
- Jazz Improvisation-Part 1: 21 video lesson, 18 play alongs, digital book, mobile app (2012)
- Jazz Saxophone-Part 1: 10 video lessons, 8 play alongs, digital book, mobile app (2013)
- The Essence of the Blues: 10 etudes for playing and improvising on the blues (2018)
- The Essence of Bebop: 10 etudes for playing and improvising in the style of bebop (2020)

== Higher education ==
- SUNY Empire State, BA 2002

== Discography ==
=== As leader ===
- On Time (Toshiba EMI, 1984)
- Mixed Bag (Criss Cross, 1987)
- Live (Red, 1989)
- Time Out (Red, 1989)
- Blue Afternoon (Criss Cross, 1989)
- Storm Rising (Ken Music, 1990) OCLC 26244383, 724909429, 472753940
- Urban Tales (Square Discs, 1991)
- While You Were Here (Red, 1991)
- Vertigo (Criss Cross, 1996)
- San Juan (Red, 1992)
- Standards Plus (Double-Time, 1997)
- The Music of Joe Henderson (Double-Time, 1999)
- Strings (Milestone, 2003)
- Close Up (Milestone, 2004)
- Tippin' (Savant, 2007)
- Crossfire (Savant, 2009)
- Interface (Savant, 2011)
- Stream of Consciousness (Savant, 2013)
- Main Street (Savant, 2015)
- MD66 (Savant, 2016)
- Jubilation! Celebrating Cannonball Adderley (Savant, 2018)
- Waves of Calm (Savant, 2019)
- Project-K (Savant, 2020)
- Live at the Deer Head Inn (Savant, 2021)
- Strings [remastered/reissued] (Savant, 2021)
- Far Far Away (Savant, 2023)
- For All We Know (Savant, 2024)
- Bird Feathers (Savant, 2025)
- House of Trane (Savant, 2026)

=== As sideman ===
- Brother Jack McDuff: Having A Good Time (1981–1982) OCLC 32941696
- Brother Jack McDuff: Lift Every Voice & Sing (1984)
- Toshiko Akiyoshi Jazz Orchestra: Ten Gallon Shuffle (1984)
- Tom Varner, Jazz French Horn (Soul Note, 1985)
- Toshiko Akiyoshi Jazz Orchestra: Wishing Peace (1986)
- Brian Lynch Sextet: Peer Pressure (1986) OCLC 28918562
- Conrad Herwig: With Every Breath (1987)
- Brian Lynch: In Process (1991) OCLC 26244449
- Greg Hatza: The Greg Hatza Organization (1993) OCLC 35452482
- Steve Brown: Night Waves (1993)
- Frank Sinatra: Duets 2 (1994)
- Frank Sinatra Jr: As I Remember It (1996)
- Walt Weiskopf Nonet: Song for My Mother (1995) OCLC 38416027
- Toshiko Akiyoshi Jazz Orchestra: Four Seasons of Morita Village (1996)
- Toshiko Akiyoshi: Time Stream: Toshiko Plays Toshiko (1996)
- Joe Magnarelli: Always There (1997) OCLC 40462561
- Toshiko Akiyoshi Jazz Orchestra featuring Lew Tabackin: Monopoly Game (1998)
- Walt Weiskopf Nonet: Siren (1999) OCLC 47806700
- Joe Magnarelli: Mr. Mags (2000) OCLC 49016327
- Capital Jazz Project: Capital Jazz Project (2001)
- David Hazeltine: Good-Hearted People (2001) OCLC 86070899
- Mike LeDonne: Bags' Groove - A Tribute to Milt Jackson (2001) OCLC 51252692
- Calogero Marrali: Homage to Jackie McLean (2001) OCLC 774013326
- Toshiko Akiyoshi Jazz Orchestra: Last Live in Blue Note Tokyo (2004)
- Sean A. Lane: Crying Sky Blue (2007)
- SteepleChase Jam Session, Vol. 29 (2010)
- To Phil, With Love (2016)
- Finefones Sax Quartet: Sonority (2019)
- Brian Lynch: The Omni-American Book Club (2019)
- Mike LeDonne: It's All Your Fault (2021)
- Brian Lynch; Bus Stop Serenade (2021)
