= Conrad Herwig =

American jazz trombonist (born 1959)

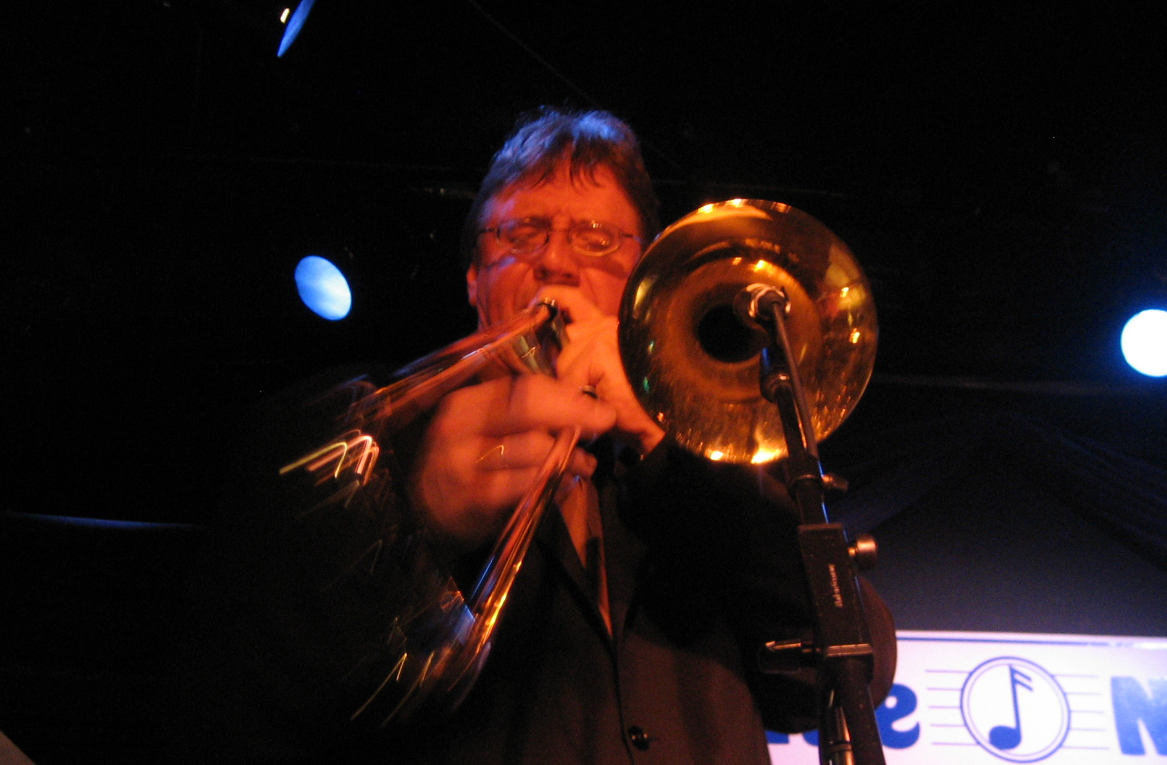
- Conrad Herwig at the Blue Note

Background information
- Born: Lee Conrad Herwig III; November 1, 1959 (age 67); Lawton, Oklahoma, U.S.
- Genre: Jazz
- Occupation: Musician
- Instrument: Trombone
- Years active: 1980's–present
- Labels: Ken; Half Note; Criss Cross
- Website: www.conradherwig.com

Lee Conrad Herwig III (born November 1, 1959) is an American jazz trombonist from New York City.

== Biography ==
Herwig began his career in Clark Terry's band in the early 1980s and has been a featured member in the Joe Henderson Sextet, Tom Harrell's Septet and Big Band, and the Joe Lovano Nonet (featured as a soloist on Lovano's 52nd Street Themes). He also performs and records with Eddie Palmieri's La Perfecta II and Afro-Caribbean Jazz Octet, Michel Camilo's 3+3, the Mingus Big Band (often serving as musical director, and was an arranger on the 2007 Grammy nominated Live at the Tokyo Blue Note), the Jon Faddis Jazz Orchestra, and Jeff "Tain" Watts Family Reunion Band, among many others.

A Voice Through the Door on Criss Cross Jazz and the Tip of the Sword on RadJazz Music featured Richie Beirach and Jack DeJohnette. He has recorded several highly acclaimed projects in the Afro-Caribbean jazz genre, including the Grammy nominated the Latin Side of Joe Henderson featuring Joe Lovano for Half Note label. This is the follow-up project to the Latin Side of Wayne Shorter, Another Kind of Blue: The Latin Side of Miles Davis, and, the Latin Side of John Coltrane. All three were nominated for Grammy Awards (in 2009, 2005, and 1998 respectively) and recorded live at the Blue Note Jazz Club in New York City. Featured musicians included Paquito D'Rivera, Dave Valentin, Eddie Palmieri, and Randy Brecker. Herwig's other solo recordings on Criss Cross are A Jones for Bones Tones, Obligation, Land of Shadow, Hieroglyphica, Unseen Universe, Osteology, and Heart of Darkness, which received 4 and 1/2 stars in Down Beat. He has been voted No. 1 Jazz Trombonist in the 1998, 1999, and 2002 Downbeat Jazz Critics' Poll and ranked highly on several occasions in the past decade. Herwig has been nominated for Trombonist of the Year by the Jazz Journalists Association on multiple occasions, including in 2015.

Herwig has conducted master classes, seminars and workshops at hundreds of universities and conservatories around the world including the Sibelius Academy, Finland; the Royal Irish Academy, Dublin; the University of Cologne, Germany; Eastman School of Music, Rochester, New York; and the University of Southern California.

The recipient of performance and teaching grants from the National Endowment for the Arts, Herwig is a professor of jazz trombone, jazz improvisation, and jazz composition and arrangement at Rutgers University. He was elected to the board of directors of the International Trombone Association. His personal instrument is a brass/nickel silver Rath R10.

Herwig is an alumnus of North Texas State University in Denton, Texas, where he performed in the One O'Clock Lab Band. He attended Goddard College in Plainfield, Vermont, and Queens College, CUNY.

== Discography ==
=== As leader ===
- With Every Breath (Sea Breeze, 1987)
- New York Hardball (Ken Music, 1990)
- Intimate Conversation (Ken Music, 1991)
- The Amulet (Ken Music, 1991)
- Ao Vivo No Festival de Jazz de Guimaraes (Groove 1994)
- The Latin Side of John Coltrane (Astor Place, 1996)
- New York Breed (Double-Time, 1996)
- A Pesar Del Diablo (Uanchu, 1997)
- Heart of Darkness (Criss Cross, 1998)
- Osteology (Criss Cross, 1998)
- Unseen Universe (Criss Cross, 2000)
- Hieroglyphica (Criss Cross, 2001)
- Shades of Light (SteepleChase, 2002)
- Land of Shadow (Criss Cross, 2002)
- Que Viva Coltrane (Criss Cross, 2004)
- Another Kind of Blue (Half Note, 2004)
- Obligation (Criss Cross, 2005)
- Sketches of Spain y Mas (Half Note, 2006)
- A Jones for Bones Tones (Criss Cross, 2007)
- The Latin Side of Wayne Shorter (Half Note, 2008)
- The Latin Side of Herbie Hancock (Half Note, 2010)
- A Voice Through the Door (Criss Cross, 2012)
- The Latin Side of Joe Henderson (Half Note, 2014)
- Reflections (Criss Cross, 2016)
- The Latin Side of Horace Silver (Savant, 2020)
- The Latin Side of Mingus (Savant, 2022)
- The Latin Side of McCoy Tyner (Savant, 2024)

=== As a member ===
Mingus Big Band

- Live in Time (Dreyfus, 1996)
- Blues & Politics (Dreyfus, 1999)
- Tonight at Noon... Three or Four Shades of Love (Dreyfus, 2002)
- I Am Three (Sunnyside/Sue Mingus, 2005)
- Live in Tokyo (Sunnyside/Sue Mingus, 2006)
- Live at Jazz Standard (Sue Mingus, 2010)

=== As sideman ===
With Toshiko Akiyoshi

- Ten Gallon Shuffle (Baystate, 1984)
- Wishing Peace (Ken Music, 1986)
- Wishing Peace from Liberty Suite (Ascent, 1986)
- Carnegie Hall Concert (Columbia, 1992)
- Desert Lady/Fantasy (Columbia, 1994)

With Robby Ameen

- Days in the Life (Two and Four, 2009)
- Diluvio (Origin, 2020)

With Mario Bauza

- Afro-Cuban Jazz (Caiman, 1986)
- Tanga (Messidor, 1992)

With Michael Davis

- Absolute Trombone (Hip-Bone Music, 1997)
- Absolute Trombone II (Hip-Bone Music, 2007)
- Hip-Bone Big Band (Hip-Bone Music, 2016)

With Paquito D'Rivera

- A Night in Englewood (Messidor, 1994)
- Live at Manchester Craftsmen's Guild (MCG, 1997)

With Bill Evans

- Push (Lipstick, 1994)
- Touch (ESC, 1999)
- Big Fun (ESC, 2002)

With Joe Henderson

- Big Band (Verve, 1996)
- Porgy & Bess (Verve, 1997)

With Ron McClure

- Sunburst (SteepleChase, 1992)
- Double Triangle (Naxos, 1999)

With Susannah McCorkle

- Let's Face the Music (Concord Jazz, 1997)
- Someone to Watch Over Me (Concord Jazz, 1998)

With Bill O'Connell

- Rhapsody in Blue (Challenge, 2010)
- Zocalo (Savant, 2013)
- Imagine (Savant, 2014)
- Heart Beat (Savant, 2016)
- Jazz Latin (Savant, 2018)

With Eddie Palmieri

- Palmas (Electra Nonesuch, 1994)
- Arete (TropiJazz, 1995)
- Vortex (TropiJazz, 1996)
- El Rumbero del Piano (RMM, 1998)
- La Perfecta II (Concord Picante, 2002)
- Ritmo Caliente (Concord Picante, 2003)
- Listen Here! (Concord Picante, 2005)
- Full Circle (Ropeadope, 2018)
- Mi Luz Mayor (Ropeadope, 2018)

With Walt Weiskopf

- Simplicity (Criss Cross Jazz, 1993)
- Song for My Mother (Criss Cross Jazz, 1996)
- Sleepless Nights (Criss Cross Jazz, 1998)
- Siren (Criss Cross Jazz, 1999)

With others

- Anthony Branker, The Forward Suite (Origin, 2014)
- Dave Bass, NYC Sessions (Whaling City Sound, 2015)
- Bob Belden, Black Dahlia (Blue Note, 2001)
- Don Braden, The New Hang (HighNote, 2004)
- Michel Camilo, One More Once (Columbia, 1994)
- Caribbean Jazz Project, Paraiso (Concord 2001)
- Elvis Costello, North (Deutsche Grammophon, 2003)
- Miles Davis & Quincy Jones, Live at Montreux (Warner Bros. 1993)
- Raul de Souza, Rio Mix (House 1999)
- Al Di Meola, Orange and Blue (Bluemoon, 1994)
- Pierre Dorge, Soundscapes (SteepleChase, 2018)
- Orrin Evans, Mother's Touch (Posi-Tone, 2014)
- Marianne Faithfull, Strange Weather (Island, 1987)
- Greg Gisbert, The Court Jester (Criss Cross, 1996)
- Tom Harrell, Time's Mirror (RCA Victor, 1999)
- Rickie Lee Jones, It's Like This (Artemis 2000)
- Eero Koivistoinen, Altered Things (Timeless, 1992)
- Frank Lacy & Mingus Big Band, Mingus Sings (Sunnyside, 2015)
- La India, Llego La India... Via Eddie Palmieri (Acid Jazz, 1992)
- Eric Leeds, Things Left Unsaid (Paisley Park/Warner Bros., 1993)
- Dave Liebman, Time Line (Owl, 1990)
- Joe Lovano, 52nd Street Themes (Blue Note, 2000)
- Brian Lynch, Spheres of Influence (Sharp Nine, 1997)
- Brian Lynch & Eddie Palmieri, Simpatico (ArtistShare, 2006)
- The Manhattan Transfer, The Chick Corea Songbook (4Q, 2009)
- David Matthews, Watermelon Man (Sweet Basil, 1997)
- Metropole Orkest, Better Get Hit in Your Soul (BHM, 2011)
- Monday Michiru, Optimista (Polydor, 1999)
- Grover Mitchell, Hip Shakin (Ken Music, 1990)
- Lisa Ono, Pretty World Suite! (Supuesto!, 2000)
- Orishas, El Kilo (Capitol, 2004)
- Tito Puente, The Mambo King (RMM, 1991)
- Tito Puente, Masterpiece/Obra Maestra (Universal, 2000)
- Tim Ries, Stones World (Sunnyside, 2008)
- Joe Roccisano, Nonet (Double-Time, 1998)
- Renee Rosnes, Life on Earth (Blue Note, 2001)
- Jim Snidero, The Music of Joe Henderson (Double-Time, 1999)
- Dave Stryker, Blue to the Bone (SteepleChase, 1996)
- Clark Terry, Live at Marihans (Chiaroscuro, 2005)
