= Dave Pietro =

American jazz musician

Dave Pietro (born February 10, 1964) is an American saxophonist, woodwind artist, bandleader, sideman, composer and educator.

== Early life and education ==
Dave Pietro was born on February 10, 1964 in Southborough, Massachusetts. Pietro earned a bachelor's degree in music education from North Texas State University where he toured and recorded four albums with the school's One O'Clock Lab Band. He also earned a Master of Arts degree in jazz composition from New York University.

== Career ==
Pietro began performing in New York City in 1987. From 1994 to 2003, Pietro played lead alto saxophone and recorded six CDs with the Toshiko Akiyoshi Jazz Orchestra. He has toured and/or recorded with the bands of Woody Herman, Lionel Hampton, Maynard Ferguson, Maria Schneider, The Village Vanguard Jazz Orchestra, John Fedchock, Mike Holober, Anita Brown, Pete McGuinness, Jim Widner and Arturo O'Farrill. Pietro has also performed with artists such as Paul Anka, Louis Bellson, Blood Sweat & Tears, Bobby Caldwell, Ray Charles, Rosemary Clooney, Harry Connick Jr., Michael Feinstein, Chaka Khan, Liza Minnelli, James Naughton, John Pizzarelli and Dave Matthews Band. Pietro also studies East Indian music and has performed with various groups led by Indian tablist Sandip Burman.

As a leader, Pietro has released six CDs with musicians such as Dave Holland, Kenny Werner, Ben Monder, Bill Stewart, Brian Blade, Scott Colley, Scott Wendholt, Duduka De Fonseca, Helio Alves and Pete McCann. Now Becoming Then (1999 A-Records) was called a "rich feast for listeners" by Bill Bennett of Jazz Times. Standard Wonder-The Music of Stevie Wonder (A-Records) was voted one of the top 10 jazz CDs of 2001 by Bob Blumenthal of the Boston Globe and Bill Milkowski of Jazz Times and received 4 stars from Downbeat magazine. Pietro's fifth CD Embrace: Impressions of Brazil (2004 A-Records) "is a triumph ... one of the most satisfying Brazilian jazz mixes since the first bossa nova tsunami" according to Judith Schlesinger of AllAboutJazz.com.

Pietro was selected as a semi-finalist for the first two Thelonious Monk Institute of Jazz International Saxophone Competitions (1991 & 1996) and was a finalist in the 1995 JAZZIZ Magazine "Woodwinds on Fire" talent search. In 1996 he was the recipient of a grant from the National Endowment for the Arts. In 2005 and 2007 he received grants from Chamber Music America's New Works Programs to compose and perform his new extended work The Chakra Suite (2008-Challenge). Featuring Gary Versace, Rez Abbasi, Todd Isler, Johannes Weidenmueller and Adam Cruz it was voted one of the top CDs of 2008 by All About Jazz

Pietro currently holds the position of Music Assistant Professor of Jazz Studies at New York University. He has given hundreds of workshops and concerts at schools around the country and is sponsored by Rico Reeds and the Conn-Selmer Instrument Company.
