= John Eckert (musician) =

American jazz musician

- Born: March 13, 1939 (age 86); Leonia, New Jersey, U.S.
- Genres: Jazz, big band
- Instruments: Trumpet

John W. Eckert (born March 13, 1939) is an American jazz trumpeter, known primarily as a big band sideman.

== Early life and education ==
Eckert was born in Leonia, New Jersey. He studied with Kenny Dorham in the late-1950s and graduated from the University of Rochester Eastman School of Music in 1961. He was a member of the Delta Upsilon fraternity. Following this, he entered a master's program at the University of North Texas.

== Career ==
In 1964, he began playing regularly in big band ensembles, working with Stan Kenton and Si Zentner; he played with Maynard Ferguson from 1966 to 1968. In the 1970s he worked with Loren Schoenberg and Lee Konitz, and in the 1980s with Gerry Mulligan, Grover Mitchell, Benny Carter, and the American Jazz Orchestra. He continued working with Mitchell and Carter into the 1990s, as well as with the legacy orchestras of Buck Clayton and Benny Goodman.

== Discography ==
With Benny Carter

- Central City Sketches (MusicMasters, 1987)
- Harlem Renaissance (MusicMasters, 1992)

With Jimmy Heath

- Little Man Big Band (Verve, 1992)

With Sam Jones

- Something New (Interplay, 1979)

With Leon Thomas

- Blues and the Soulful Truth (Flying Dutchman, 1972)
