= Walt Weiskopf =

Musical artist (born 1959)

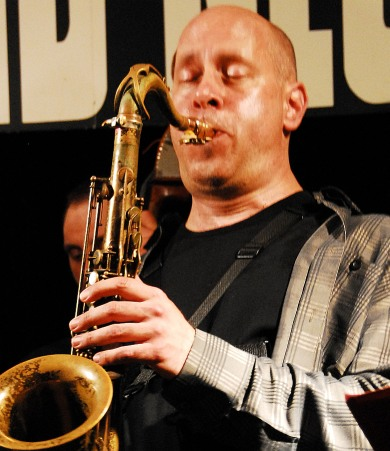
- Walt Weiskopf performing on stage

Background information
- Born: Walter Weiskopf; July 30, 1959 (age 66); Augusta, Georgia, U.S.
- Genres: Avant-garde jazz; hard bop; post-bop; modal jazz; free jazz
- Occupations: Musician; composer; author
- Instruments: Tenor; soprano; alto saxophone; clarinet
- Years active: 1981–present
- Labels: Criss Cross; Posi-Tone
- Website: WaltWeiskopf.com

Walt Weiskopf (born July 30, 1959, in Augusta, Georgia) is an American jazz saxophonist, multi-instrumentalist, composer, author and educator. He has released sixteen albums as a leader, and performed on countless other albums as a sideman. He has collaborated with artists such as Buddy Rich, Frank Sinatra and Steely Dan.

Author and journalist Cicily Janus regards Weiskopf as "one of the best unknown musicians in the modern scene", and JazzTimes Magazine considers him to be underrated and "a highly potent tenor saxophonist who demonstrates a strong Trane-Rollins influence".

== Early life ==
Weiskopf was born in Augusta, Georgia. He grew up outside of Syracuse, New York. He took up his first instrument, the clarinet, at age 10. He began his saxophone studies four years later. He studied at the Eastman School of Music of the University of Rochester from 1977 to 1980. After earning his BA in Music Performance, he moved to New York City in September 1980.

== Professional career ==
Weiskopf began his New York career performing with the Buddy Rich Big Band in 1981 at the age of 21, and began a 14-year stint with the Toshiko Akiyoshi Jazz Orchestra two years later. Since then he has released 16 recordings as a leader, and holds numerous credits as a sideman.

In 1988, Weiskopf decided to attend Queens College of the City of New York, where he spent 2 years studying with clarinetist Leon Russianoff. He later earned a Master of Arts degree in clarinet performance. Over the next two decades he went on to perform with a number of notable orchestras, including the American Ballet Theatre, the American Composers Orchestra and the Gotham Chamber Orchestra.

In 2002, Weiskopf became a part of the popular music group Steely Dan, and was featured on the title track of their 2003 album Everything Must Go. In 2006, he began to tour and perform with the Donald Fagen Band, as well as with the Dukes of September in 2010.

In addition to performing, Weiskopf has taught at a number of different universities, and authored several books on jazz improvisation. Between 1996 and 2000, he was an adjunct professor at New Jersey City University in Jersey City, New Jersey. From 2001 to 2009, Weiskopf was a visiting associate professor at the Eastman School of Music, and taught part-time at Temple University in Philadelphia from 2010 to 2012. He was most recently a Coordinator of Jazz Studies at New Jersey City University in Jersey City, New Jersey.

In 1991 and 1993 respectively, Weiskopf co-authored Coltrane: A Player's Guide To His Harmony and The Augmented Scale in Jazz (publisher J. Aebersold) with Ramon Ricker. He completed Intervalic Improvisation (publisher Aebersold) in 1994. His fourth book, Around The Horn, was released in 2001. The sequel Beyond The Horn, co-authored with his former student Ed RosenBerg, was released in 2006. His most recent book, Understanding the Diminished Scale, was released in 2013.

== Recognition ==
Weiskopf has received three performance grants from the National Endowment for the Arts. He also was awarded funding for the creation and recording of his 2004 sextet recording, Sight to Sound (Criss Cross Jazz), from the Doris Duke Charitable Foundation and Chamber Music America. This suite of ten movements was inspired by the work of visual artists Dalí, Picasso, Van Gogh, Miró, and others.

== Discography ==
As leader

- 1989: Exact Science (Iris 1002) with Joel Weiskopf, Jay Anderson & Jeff Hirshfield
- 1991: MindWalking (Iris 1003) with Joel Weiskopf, Jay Anderson & Jeff Hirshfield
- 1992: Simplicity (Criss Cross Jazz 1075) with Andy Fusco, Conrad Herwig, Joel Weiskopf, Peter Washington & Billy Drummond
- 1994: A World Away (Criss Cross Jazz 1100) with Larry Goldings, Peter Bernstein & Bill Stewart
- 1995: Song for My Mother (Criss Cross Jazz 1127) with Anders Bostrom, Jim Snidero, Joe Magnarelli, Scott Robinson, Joel Weiskopf, Peter Washington & Billy Drummond
- 1996: Night Lights (Doubletime Records 106) with Joel Weiskopf, Drew Gress & Steve Davis
- 1997: Sleepless Nights (Criss Cross Jazz 1147) with Andy Fusco, Conrad Herwig, Joel Weiskopf, James Genus & Billy Drummond
- 1999: Anytown (Criss Cross Jazz) with Joe Locke, Renee Rosnes, Doug Weiss & Tony Reedus
- 2000: Siren (Criss Cross Jazz 1187) – with Anders Bostrom, Jim Snidero, Joe Magnarelli, Scott Robinson, Joel Weiskopf, Doug Weiss & Billy Drummond
- 2002: Man of Many Colors (Criss Cross Jazz 1219) with Brad Mehldau, John Patitucci & Clarence Penn
- 2004: Sight To Sound (Criss Cross Jazz 1250) with Andy Fusco, John Mosca, Joel Weiskopf, Doug Weiss & Billy Drummond
- 2005: Tea For Two (Criss Cross Jazz 1265) with Andy Fusco, Joel Weiskopf, Paul Gill & Billy Drummond
- 2008: Day In, Night Out (Criss Cross Jazz 1300) with Andy Fusco, Michael Leonhart, John Mosca, Gary Smulyan, Peter Zak, Doug Weiss & Kendrick Scott
- 2010: See The Pyramid (Criss Cross Jazz 1327) with Peter Zak, Doug Weiss & Quincy Davis
- 2011: LIVE (Capri 74109-2) with Renee Rosnes, Paul Gill & Tony Reedus
- 2014: Overdrive (Posi-Tone) with Yotam Silberstein, Behn Gillece, Peter Zak, David Wong & Donald Edwards
- 2015: Open Road (Posi-Tone) with Peter Zak, Mike Karn & Steve Fidyk
- 2016: The Way You Say It (Posi-Tone) with Brian Charette, Behn Gillece & Steve Fidyk
- 2017: Fountain of Youth (Posi-Tone) with Peter Zak, Mike Karn, Behn Gillece & Steve Fidyk
- 2018: Walt Weiskopf European Quartet: (Orenda Records) with Carl Winther, Daniel Franck & Anders Mogensen
- 2019: Walt Weiskopf European Quartet: Worldwide (Orenda Records) with Carl Winther, Andreas Lang & Anders Mogensen
- 2020: Walt Weiskopf European Quartet: Introspection (AMM) with Carl Winther, Andreas Lang & Anders Mogensen
- 2021: Walt Weiskopf European Quartet: Introspection 2.0 (AMM) with Carl Winther, Andreas Lang & Anders Mogensen
- 2022: Walt Weiskopf European Quartet: Diamonds and Other Jewels (AMM) with Carl Winther, Andreas Lang & Anders Mogensen
- 2023: Walt Weiskopf European Quartet: Harmless Addiction (AMM) with Carl Winther, Andreas Lang & Anders Mogensen
- 2024: Walt Weiskopf European Quartet: A Little Christmas Music (AMM) with Carl Winther, Andreas Lang & Anders Mogensen

As Sideman

- 1982: Frank Sinatra/Buddy Rich – Concert for the Americas (DVD)
- 1984: Toshiko Akiyoshi/Lew Tabackin – Desert Lady Fantasy (BMG Victor)
- 1984: Toshiko Akiyoshi/Lew Tabackin – Ten Gallon Shuffle (Ascent Records)
- 1986: Toshiko Akiyoshi/Lew Tabackin – Wishing Peace (Concord)
- 1986: Toshiko Akiyoshi/Lew Tabackin/Frank Wess – Wishing Peace From "Liberty Suite (Ascent Records)
- 1988: Jean-Loup Longnon & His New York Orchestra – Jean-Loup Longnon & His New York Orchestra
- 1989: American Composers Orchestra – Four Symphonic Works By Duke Ellington (Musicmasters)
- 1990: Roland Vazquez – No Separate Love
- 1990: Toshiko Akiyoshi The Four Seasons (Nippon Crown)
- 1991: Toshiko Akiyoshi – Chic Lady (Nippon Crown)
- 1992: Toshiko Akiyoshi/Lew Tabackin – Carnegie Hall Concert (Columbia)
- 1993: Maurice Peress – D. Ellington/American Composers Orchestra (Musicmasters)
- 1993: Bill Warfield – The City Never Sleeps (Seabreeze)
- 1993: Toshiko Akiyoshi/Lew Tabackin – Desert Lady Fantasy (Concord)
- 1993: Toshiko Akiyoshi – Dig (Nippon Crown)
- 1994: Toshiko Akiyoshi – Night and Dream (Nippon Crown)
- 1994: The Buddy Rich Big Band – Burning For Buddy – A Tribute to the Music of Buddy Rich (Atlantic Records)
- 1994: Dave Stryker – Nomad
- 1995: Billy Drummond – Dubai (Criss Cross Jazz)
- 1995: Buddy Rich Big Band – Burning For Buddy (Atlantic)
- 1996: Jim Snidero – Vertigo (Criss Cross Jazz)
- 1996: Frank Sinatra, Jr. – As I Remember It (Angel)
- 1997: Andy Fusco – Big Man's Blues (Doubletime)
- 1997: Mark Soskin – Five Lands (TCB)
- 1997: The Buddy Rich Big Band – Burning For Buddy – A Tribute to the Music of Buddy Rich Volume II (Atlantic Records)
- 1998: Conrad Herwig – Heart of Darkness (Criss Cross Jazz)
- 1998: Cutting Edge – The Cutting Edge
- 2000: Linda Eder – Christmas Stays the Same
- 2001: Renee Rosnes – With A Little Help From My Friends (Blue Note)
- 2001: Joel Weiskopf – New Beginning (Criss Cross Jazz)
- 2002: Darius de Haas – Day Dream: Variations on Strayhorn
- 2002: Audra McDonald – Happy Songs
- 2002: Renee Rosnes – Life on Earth (Blue Note)
- 2002: Original Broadway Cast – Thoroughly Modern Millie
- 2003: Steely Dan – Everything Must Go (Warner Bros. Records)
- 2003: Geoff Muldaur Futuristic Ensemble – Private Astronomy: A Vision of the Music of Bix Beiderbecke (Edge Music)
- 2003: Linda Eder – Broadway My Way
- 2003: Michelle Conte – Lucky Me!
- 2005: Tom Christiensen – New York School (Playscape)
- 2005: Eri Nobuchika – 鼓動 (Fearless Records)
- 2005: Donald Fagen – Morph The Cat (Reprise Records)
- 2006: Walt Weiskopf/Dick Oatts/Billy Drewes – Jam Session No. 18 (Steeplechase)
- 2006: Donald Fagen – Morph The Cat (Reprise)
- 2006: Steely Dan – The Definitive Collection (Compilation)
- 2006: Randy Sandke – The Subway Ballet
- 2006: Brian Stokes Mitchell – Brian Stokes Mitchell
- 2007: Steve Smith/Jazz Legacy – Live on Tour (Drum Legacy)
- 2007: Roland Vazquez – Quintet Live
- 2007: Various artists – We All Love Ella: Celebrating the First Lady of Song (Compilation, Verve)
- 2008: Steve Smith's Jazz Legacy – Live at the Modern Drummer Festival (Hudson/DVD)
- 2008: Steve Smith's Jazz Legacy – Live on Tour, Vol. 2
- 2008: Pamela Luss – Magnet
- 2009: Steve Smith's Jazz Legacy – Live on Tour, Vol. 1
- 2010: John Fedchock Sextet – Live at The Red Sea Jazz Festival (Capri)
- 2010: Peter Zak – The Decider (SteepleChase)
- 2011: Vanguard Jazz Orchestra – Forever Lasting/Live in Japan (Planet Arts)
- 2011: Renolds Jazz Orchestra – Three Penny Opera – Live in Aarau (Shanti Records)
- 2012: Donald Fagen – Sunken Condos (Reprise)
- 2014: Donald Fagen/Michael McDonald/Boz Scaggs – Live at Lincoln Center – The Dukes of September (429 Records)
- 2016: Doug Webb – Triple Play

== Publications ==
- 1991: Coltrane: A Player's Guide (publisher J. Aebersold – co-authored by Ramon Ricker) ASIN B000PIFI54
- 1993: The Augmented Scale in Jazz (publisher J. Aebersold) – co-authored by Ramon Ricker) ISBN 978-1562240318
- 1995: Intervalic Improvisation (publisher J. Aebersold)
- 2000: Around The Horn: 21 Modal Scales and Arpeggios Every Jazz Musician Needs To Know (publisher J. Aebersold) ISBN 978-1562240301
- 2006: Beyond The Horn: Challenging Exercises & Etudes for Modern Improvisation (publisher J. Aebersold) – co-authored by Ed RosenBerg) ISBN 978-1562240493
- 2010: Intervallic Improvisation – The Modern Sound: A Step Beyond Linear Improvisation (publisher J. Aebersold) ISBN 978-1562242596
- 2010: Giant Steps: A Player's Guide To Coltrane's Harmony for ALL Instrumentalists (publisher J. Aebersold) – co-authored by Ramon Ricker) ISBN 978-1562240530
- 2013: Understanding the Diminished Scale: A Guide for the Modern Player (publisher J. Aebersold)) ASIN 1562242881
- 2016: 16 Moderately Challenging Jazz Solos (publisher J. Aebersold))
