= Joe Magnarelli =

American jazz musician (born 1960)

- Born: Joseph Anthony Magnarelli; January 19, 1960 (age 66); Syracuse, New York, U.S.
- Genres: Jazz
- Instruments: Trumpet, flugelhorn
- Spouse: Akiko Tsuruga
- Education: State University of New York at Fredonia (BMus)

Joseph Anthony Magnarelli (born January 19, 1960) is an American jazz trumpeter and flugelhornist.

== Early life and education ==
Magnarelli was born in Syracuse, New York. He received a bachelor's degree from the State University of New York at Fredonia in 1982 and began playing in New York City in 1986.

== Career ==
Magnarelli was a member of Lionel Hampton's ensemble (1987–1989) and worked with Brother Jack McDuff from 1989 to 1994. He cofounded the New York Hard Bop Quintet in 1991 and led his own ensembles in the 1990s, often with John Swana and Jerry Weldon. He also worked as a sideman with Toshiko Akiyoshi, Laverne Butler, Harry Connick, Jr., the Buddy Rich band (after Rich's death), Maria Schneider, Gary Smulyan, Grant Stewart, the Vanguard Jazz Orchestra, Walt Weiskopf, and Ben Wolfe.

Since 2017 Magnarelli has frequently performed with the Sant Andreu Jazz Band in Barcelona under the direction of Joan Chamorro.

== Discography ==
- Why Not (Criss Cross Jazz, 1995)
- Always There (Criss Cross, 1998)
- Philly-New York Junction (Criss Cross, 1998)
- Mr. Mags (Criss Cross, 2001)
- New York-Philly Junction (Criss Cross, 2003)
- Persistence (Reservoir, 2008)
- My Old Flame (Give and Go Records, 2010)
- Lookin' Up! (Posi-Tone, 2014)
- Three On Two (Posi-Tone, 2015)
- Magic Trick (SteepleChase, 2018)
- New York Osaka Junction (SteepleChase, 2022)
- Concord, (SteepleChase, 2025)
- Decidedly So (Cellar Music Group, 2026)

With Akiko Tsuruga

- Sakura (American Showplace, 2011)
- Beyond Nostalgia (SteepleChase, 2024)
