= George Kawaguchi =

Japanese jazz drummer (1927–2003)

Joji "George" Kawaguchi (川口譲二) (June 15, 1927, Fukakusa, Kyoto - November 1, 2003, Tokyo) was a Japanese jazz drummer and bandleader.

Kawaguchi was raised in Dairen, Manchukuo, at that time a Japanese-occupied territory. He played in his father's ensemble as a teenager, and after World War II moved back to Japan, where he embarked on a career in jazz. He played first with an ensemble called the Azumanians, then joined the Big Four with Hidehiko Matsumoto, Hachidai Nakamura, and Mitsuru Ono; this ensemble played intermittently into the 1980s. He played extensively with Art Blakey on tour in the 1980s. He recorded extensively as a leader; his sidemen included Isao Suzuki, Motohiko Hino, Takeshi Inomata, Donald Harrison, Terence Blanchard, Norio Maeda, Tatsuya Takahashi, and Nobuo Hara.

On July 22, 1966, he played with the John Coltrane quintet in Tokyo while the group was touring Japan.

== Discography ==
=== As leader ===
Of the Big Four

- Jazz at the Torys' (King, 1957) – live
- The Original Big Four (King, 1959)
- Caravan (Takt, 1967)
- The Life (Royal, 1967)
- George and Sleepy (Victor, 1969)
- Blow! Blow! Big 4 (Columbia, 1974)
- The Big 4 (TBM, 1976)
- Original Big Four Live (Philips, 1977) – live

Of the Big Four plus One

- On Stage! Big 4 Plus 1 (Victor, 1958) – live
- The Life (Royal, 1967)
- Big Apple (Crown, 2000)

Of other bands

- Super George & The Super Band (Paddle Wheel, 1979)
- African Hot Dance (Electric Bird, 1980)
- Super Drums 2: Tribute To Gene Krupa (Paddle Wheel, 1983)
- Super George (Paddle Wheel, 1985)
- George Kawaguchi Plays Herbie Hancock (Paddle Wheel, 1987)

=== Collaborations ===
- Drum-Scope with Hideo Shiraki, Jimmy Takeuchi, Nobuo Hara (King, 1957)
- Drum & Drum with Akira Ishikawa (Teichiku, 1970)
- Drummer Man Drums with Takeshi Inomata, Isamu Harada, Motohiko Hino (Warner Bros., 1971)
- Hakunetsu-no (Fiery) Drum Battle with Frankie Sakai (Victor, 1976)
- The Drum Battle with Jimmy Takeuchi, Donald Bailey, Shingo Okudaira (Toshiba, 1979)
- Killer Joe with Art Blakey (Union Jazz, 1982)
- Big 2 with Lionel Hampton (Paddle Wheel, 1982)
