= Three Blind Mice (record label) =

Japanese jazz record label

Three Blind Mice is a Japanese jazz record label founded in June 1970 as a showcase for Japan's emerging jazz performers. More than 130 albums have been released since then. So far they have won the Jazz Disc Award five times in Japan. Produced by Takeshi Fujii and often recorded by the Yoshihiko Kannari, TBM created jazz records by Japanese players since the 1970s and became known for its audiophile sound quality. TBM's records captured a very important, vibrant era in the development of Japanese jazz. Stars like Isao Suzuki, Tsuyoshi Yamamoto, George Kawaguchi, Terumasa Hino and Mari Nakamoto recorded their very first albums with the label. Artists also include Shuko Mizuno's "Jazz Orchestra '73", Toshiyuko Miyama and Masaru Imada.

== Discography ==
- TBM-1 Kosuke Mine Quintet -Mine (LP) 1970
- TBM-2 Masaru Imada Quartet -NOW! (LP) 1970
- TBM-3 Takao Uematsu Quartet/Quintet -Debut (LP) 1970
- TBM-4 Kosuke Mine Quintet -2nd Album (LP) 1970
- TBM-5 Albert Mangelsdorff Quartet -Diggin' - Live At Dug, Tokyo (LP) 1971
- TBM-6 Hideto Kanai Group -Q (LP)
- TBM-7 Allan Praskin Quartet -Encounter (LP, Album) 1971
- TBM-8 Kimiko Kasai With Kosuke Mine Quartet -Yellow Carcass In The Blue (LP) 1971
- TBM-9 Masayuki Takayanagi & New Century Music Institute -Ginparis Session - June 26, 1963 (LP) 1971
- TBM-10 New Direction For The Arts -Free Form Suite (LP, Album) 1972
- TBM-11 Toya Shigeko With The Imada Masaru Trio (LP) 1972
- TBM-12 Sunao Wada Quartet/Sextet -Coco's Blues' (LP) 1972
- TBM-13 George Otsuka Quintet -Go On (LP) 1972
- TBM-14 Masaru Imada Solo/Trio -Poppy (LP) 1973
- TBM-15 Isao Suzuki Trio/Quartet -Blow Up (LP) 1973
- TBM-16 Shigeko Toya & Her Jazz Friends -Fine And Mellow (LP) 1973
- TBM-17 Terumasa Hino Quintet -Live! (LP) 1973
- TBM-18 Teruo Nakamura Group -Unicorn (LP) 1973
- TBM-19 Hiroshi Fukumura Quintet -Fukumura Hiroshi Quintet (LP) 1973
- TBM-20 Naosuka Miyamoto Sextet -Step! (LP) 1973
- TBM-21 Mari Nakamoto & Yasuro Osawa Trio+2 -Unforgettable (LP) 1973
- TBM-22 Masaru Imada Trio & Shigeko Toya -Yokohama Concert (LP) 1973
- TBM-23 Tsuyoshi Yamamoto Trio -Midnight Sugar (LP) 1974
- TBM-24 Isao Suzuki Quartet Plus One -Blue City (LP) 1974
- TBM-25 Sunao Wada Quartet/Quintet -Blues World (LP) 1974
- TBM-26 Kunihiko Sugano Trio +1 -Love Is a Many Splendored Thing (LP) 1974
- TBM-27 Kenji Mori, Hideo Ichikawa Trio -Solo & Trio (LP) 1974
- TBM-28 Takashi Mizuhashi Quartet+2 -When A Man Loves A Woman (LP) 1974
- TBM-29 Isao Suzuki & Sunao Wada plus Tsuyoshi Yamamoto Trio, George Otsuka Quintet+2 -Now's The Time (LP) 1974
- TBM-30 Tsuyoshi Yamamoto Trio -Misty (LP) 1974
- TBM-31 Takashi Mizuhashi Quartet -Who Cares (LP) 1974
- TBM-32 Toshiyuki Miyama & The New Herd -New Herd (LP) 1974
- TBM-33 Mari Nakamoto With The Shoji Yokouchi And Yuri Tashiro -Little Girl Blue (LP) 1974
- TBM-34 Kimiko Kasai With Kosuke Mine Quartet -Yellow Caracas In The Blue (LP) [RE:TBM-8] 1974
- TBM-35 George Otsuka Trio -You Are My Sunshine (LP) 1974
- TBM-36 Isao Suzuki Quartet+1 -All Right (LP) 1974
- TBM-37 Tsuyoshi Yamamoto Trio -Live At The Misty (LP) 1974
- TBM-38 Takashi Furuya Quintet -Solitude (LP) 1975
- TBM-39 Masaru Imada + 2 -Green Caterpillar (LP, Wit) 1975
- TBM-40 Yoshiko Goto With Takashi Mizuhashi Quartet -Day Dream (LP) 1975
- TBM-41 Tsuyoshi Yamamoto Trio -Blues For Tee (LP) 1974
- TBM-42 Masaru Imada Quartet -Now! (LP) 1970
- TBM-43 Inaba & Nakamura Duo -Conversation (LP) 1975
- TBM-44 Isao Suzuki Quartet + 2 -Oran-Utan (LP) 1975
- TBM-45 Hideto Kanai & Kings Roar Orchestra -Ode To Birds (LP) 1975
- TBM-46 Hidefumi Toki Quartet -Toki (LP) 1975
- TBM-47 Masaru Imada Trio -One For Duke (LP) 1975
- TBM-48 Toshiyuki Miyama And The New Herd Orchestra -Take The A Train (LP) 1975
- TBM-49 Sunao Wada Quintet / Hitomi Ueda / Ushio Sakai Trio -Blues For Bird (LP) 1975
- TBM-50 Sanae Mizushima -You've Got A Friend (LP) 1975
- TBM-51 Yoshio Otomo / Hidefumi Toki - Alto Madness -Lover Man (LP) 1975
- TBM-52 Tsuyoshi Yamamoto Trio -The In Crowd (LP) 1974
- TBM-53 Seiichi Nakamura Trio/Quintet -Adventure In My Dream (LP) 1975
- TBM-54 Yoshiko Goto With Inaba & Nakamure Duo -A Touch Of Love (LP) 1975
- TBM-55 Toshiyuki Miyama & The New Herd Plus All-Star Guests* Shuko Mizuno's -"Jazz Orchestra '73" (LP) 1973
- TBM-56 Mari Nakamoto With Isao Suzuki & Kazumi Watanabe Duo -Mari Nakamoto III (LP) 1975
- TBM-57 Isao Suzuki & His Fellows -Touch (LP) 1975
- TBM-58 Koji Moriyama With The Tsuyoshi Yamamoto Trio -Night And Day (LP) 1975
- TBM-59 Tsuyoshi Yamamoto Trio -Yama & Jiro's Wave -Girl Talk (LP) 1975
- TBM-60 Masaru Imada -Masaru Imada Piano (LP) 1975
- TBM-61 Motohiko Hino Quartet + 1 "Ryuhyo" - Sailing Ice (LP) 1976
- TBM-62 George Otsuka Quintet -Physical Structure (LP) 1976
- TBM-63 Isao Suzuki Trio -Black Orpheus (LP) 1976
- TBM-64 Toshio Oida -It Was A Very Good Year (LP) 1976
- TBM-65 Shoji Yokouchi Quartet -Blonde On The Rocks (LP) 1976
- TBM-66 George Kawaguchi's The Big 4 -The Big 4 (LP) 1976
- TBM-67 Toshiyuki Miyama & The New Herd -Sunday Thing (LP) 1976
- TBM-68 Tatsuya Takahasi & The Tokyo Union -Got The Spirit (LP) 1976
- TBM-69 Tsuyoshi Yamamoto Trio -Summertime (LP) 1976
- TBM-70 Toshiyuki Miyama & The New Herd -The World Of Shuko Mizuno (LP) 1976
- TBM-71 Shigeko Toya, Mari Nakamoto With The Tsuyoshi Yamamoto Trio -Shigeo & Mari (LP) 1976
- TBM-72 Kunio Ohta Quartet+1 -Free And Lovely (LP) 1976
- TBM-73 Hideo Ichikawa Trio -Tomorrow (LP) 1976
- TBM-74 Hidehiko Matsumoto Quartet -Sleepy (LP) 1976
- TBM-75 Sunao Wada Quintet+1 -Four Scenes (LP) 1976
- TBM-76 Isao Suzuki Sextet -Ako's Dream (LP) 1976
- TBM-77 Masaru Imada Trio -Standards (LP) 1976
- TBM-78 Isoo Fukui Quartet -Sunrise Sunset (LP) 1976
- TBM-1001 Toshiyuki Miyama & The New Herd Plus All-Star Guests* Shuko Mizuno's -"Jazz Orchestra '73" (LP)[RE:TBM-55] 1973
- TBM-1002.3 George Otsuka Quintet -In Concert (2LP) 1973
- TBM-1004 Toshiyuki Miyama & The New Herd + All Star Guests -Shuko Mizuno's Jazz Orchestra '75" (LP) 1975
- TBM-1005 Tatsuya Takahashi and The Tokyo Union + 3 -Scandinavian Suite (LP) 1977
- TBM-3001 Tatsuya Takahashi and The Tokyo Union -Maiden Voyage (LP) 1976
- TBM-3002 Kunio Ohta Quintet -My Back Page (LP) 1976
- TBM-3003 Kenji Mori Quartet -Firebird (LP) 1977
- TBM-3004 Fumio Karashima Trio -Gathering (LP) 1977
- TBM-3005 Mari Nakamoto With Shoji Yokouchi Trio/Sextet -Mari (LP) 1977
- TBM-3006 Yuji Imamura & Air (6) -Air (LP) 1977
- TBM-3007 Yoshio Otomo Quartet -Moon Ray (LP) 1977
- TBM-3008 Ayako Hosokawa With Tsuyoshi Yamamoto And The Strings -Mr. Wonderful (LP) 1977
- TBM-3009 Tsuyoshi Yamamoto With The Strings -Star Dust (LP) 1977
- TBM-4001 Jimmy, Yoko & Shin -Sei Shonagon (LP) 1978
- TBM-4002 Window Pane -Window Pane (LP) 1978
- TBM(P)-4003 Zap(21) -Dream Traveler (LP) 1979
- TBM-5001 Sunao Wada Quartet Featuring Isao Suzuki And Masaru Imada -Blues-Blues-Blues (LP) 1977
- TBM-5002 Koji Moriyama + Tsuyoshi Yamamoto Trio -Smile (LP) 1977
- TBM-5003 Masaru Imada & George Mraz -Alone Together (LP) 1977
- TBM-5004 Tee & Company -Sonnet (LP) 1977
- TBM-5005 Ayako Hosokawa With The Masaru Imada Quartet -No Tears (LP) 1977
- TBM-5006 Tee & Company - Dragon Garden (LP) 1977
- TBM-5007 Masaru Imada Quartet -Remember Of Love (LP) 1978
- TBM-5008 Tee & Company -Spanish Flower (LP) 1977
- TBM-5009 Tsuyoshi Yamamoto Trio - Midnight Sun (LP) 1978
- TBM 5010 Bingo Miki & Inner Galaxy Orchestra (LP) 1978
- TBM-5011 Shoji Yokouchi Trio Plus Yuri Tashiro - Greensleeves (LP) 1978
- TBM-5012 Hideto Kanai Quintet - Concierto De Aranjuez (LP) 1978
- TBM-5013 Ayako Hosokawa With T. Miyama & The New Herd - Call Me (LP) 1979
- TBM(P)-5014 Hidehiko Matsumoto Quartet - Samba De Sun (LP) 1979
- TBM(P)-5015 Hideto Kanai Quintet - What (LP) 1979
- TBM(P)-5016 Toshiyuki Miyama & The New Herd - Gallery (LP) 1979
- TBM(P)-5018 Jojo Takayanagi Second Concept - Cool Jojo (LP) 1980
- TBM(P)-5019 Tsuyoshi Yamamoto Trio -Live in Montreux (LP)
- TBM(P)-5020 Mari Nakamoto - What A Difference A Day Made (LP) 1980
- TBM(P)-5022 Zap - Oh! Sunshine (LP) 1980
- TBM(P)-5023 New Direction Unit - Live At Moers Festival (LP) 1980
- PAP-25022 Eiji Nakayama With Masaru Imada - North Plain (LP) 1982
- PAP-25030 Masayuki "Jojo" Takayanagi - Lonely Woman (LP) 1982
- PAP-25036 Martha Miyake - Remember (LP) 1982
- PAP-25042 Toshio Ohsumi Trio Featuring Hiromu Aoki - Watermelon Man (LP) 1983
- TBM-CD-5031 Yoshiyuki Yamanaka Quintet + 2 - Peggy's Blue Skylight (CD) 1988
- TBM-CD-5032 Takayuki Kato Trio - Guitar Music (CD) 1989
- TBM-CD-5033 Mikinori Fujiwara Quartet + 1 - Touch Spring (CD) 1990
- TBM-CD-5034 Sachi Hayakawa & Stir Up - Straight to the Core (CD) 1990
- TBM-CD-5037 Shunzo Ohno - Maya (CD) 1992
- TBM-CD-5038 Mikinori Fujiwara Group - Wild Rose (CD) 1993
- TBM-CD-5039 Ayako Hosokawa - A Whisper Of Love (CD) 1993
- TBM-CD-5040 Ushio Sakai - Blues Meeting (CD) 1994
- TBM-XR-5041 Takayuki Kato Trio - Guitar Standards (CD) 2001
- TBM-XR-5043 Toshiyuki Akamatsu - Six Intentions (CD) 2002
- TBM-XR-5044 Eiji Nakayama Group with Masaru Imada - North Plain (CD) [RE:PAP-25022] 2003
- TBM-XR-5045 Martha Miyake - Remember (CD) 2003 [RE:PAP-25036] 2003
- TBM-XR-5046 Toshiyuki Akamatsu - Still On The Air (CD) 2002
- TBM-CD-1885 Tee & Company - OKUNI OF IZUMO (CD) 2003
- TBM-CD-1889 Duke Jordan - So Nice Duke (CD) 2002
- TBM-CD-1890 Takayuki Kato - Synapse (CD) 2004
- TBM-CD-2842 Takeshi Kamachi -Spread (CD) 2002
- TBM-CD-9001 The Famous Sound Of Three Blind Mice vol. 1
- TBM-CD-9002 The Famous Sound Of Three Blind Mice vol. 2
- TBM-CD-9003 The Famous Sound Of Three Blind Mice vol. 3
- NKCD-1486 Mayumi Lowe -It's My Love (CD) 2004
