= Akitoshi Igarashi =

Japanese jazz saxophonist

Akitoshi Igarashi (五十嵐 明要, Igarashi Akitoshi, born June 2, 1932 in Tokyo) is a Japanese jazz saxophonist.

Igarashi did not begin playing saxophone until the age of 19, but within a year was playing in a band led by Shungo Sawada. He played with Shotaro Moriyasu in 1954 and following this played with a series of large ensembles, such as the West Liners, Nobuo Hara's Sharps and Flats, The Blue Coats, and the orchestra of Shigenori Obara.

== Discography ==
- Hisaya Omata; Yasuhiro Tōmoto; Akitoshi Igarashi; Shōji Suzuki; Hachidai Nakamura; Akio Nagata; Shin Watanabe; Hideo Shiraki; Richard Rodgers; Lorenz Hart; Yoshiaki Takei; Akira Fukuhara (1958). Jazu fesutivaru obu japan : suingu jānaru ōru sutā jazu konsāto [Jazz festival of japan : swing journal all stars jazz concert by poll winners] (Music recording). Tokyo: Tōshiba EMI. OCLC 835745113.
- Martha Miyake; Norio Maeda et al. (1978). This is Martha (Music LP; English). New emotional jazz series. Tokyo: King Record Co. OCLC 43310876.
- Akira Watanabe; Tetsuo Takeuchi; Takeshi Inomata; Keitarō Miho; Toshio Suzuki; Seiji Hiraoka; Jun Sugihara; Hisaya Omata; Jimī Takeuchi; Yuzuru Sera; Gene De Paul; Akitoshi Igarashi (1991). Modan jazuhen II [Modern jazz scene II]. Nihon jazu taikei [A history of King jazz recordings]. Vol. 6. Tokyo: King Records Japan. OCLC 835649223.
- George Gershwin; Sadao Watanabe; Akitoshi Igarashi; Masao Yagi; Shungo Sawada; Kiyoshi Yamaya et al. (1991). Modan jazuhen III [Modern jazz scene III] (Music CD). Nihon jazu taikei [A history of King jazz recordings]. Vol. 7. Tokyo: King Records Japan. OCLC 835649446.
- Eiji Kitamura; Ken'ichi Sonoda; Muneyoshi Nishiyo; Hoagy Carmichael; Hidehiko Matsumoto; Shin Watanabe; Mitchell Parish; Frederick Loewe; Alan Jay Lerner; Akitoshi Igarashi et al. (1991). Kingu jazufesutibaru atto sankeihōru [King jazz festival at sankei hall] (Music CD). Nihon jazu taikei [A history of King jazz recordings]. Vol. 9. Tokyo: King Records Japan. OCLC 835203500.
- Ichiro Masuda; Akitoshi Igarashi; Kohnosuke Saijyo; Yoko Masuda; Super Big Band (1992). NHK-FM live session '92 (Music CD; English). Japan: GML. OCLC 271351685.
- Ushio Itoh [producer]; Akitoshi Igarashi; Tohru Konishi; [Yutaka Sasaki] (1995). Here at last (Music CD; English; 1 audio disc (approximately 62 min.); digital, stereo; 4 3/4 in. + 1 booklet). Cisco Music, Inc. OCLC 862919384.
