= Nobuyoshi Ino =

- Born: March 26, 1950 (age 75); Kiryū, Gunma, Japan
- Genres: Jazz
- Occupation: Musician
- Instrument: double bass
- Years active: 1969 –

Nobuyoshi Ino (born March 26, 1950, Gunma) is a Japanese jazz double-bassist.

Ino began playing professionally in the early 1970s, and worked in that decade with Motohiko Hino, Terumasa Hino, Kosuke Mine, Akira Miyazawa, Masahiko Sato, Isao Suzuki, Hidefumi Toki, and Kazumi Watanabe. Early in the 1980s he played with Masayuki Takayanagi and Aki Takase, then formed a duo with Lester Bowie, performing from 1984 to 1988 (including on the 1985 album Duet). He also worked with Alex Schlippenbach and Sunny Murray in a trio setting and toured with Elvin Jones. He founded an ensemble called Four Sounds in 1989 which featured Kosuke Mine, Fumio Itabashi, and Hiroshi Murakami as sidemen. Later in his career he worked with Masahiko Togashi as well as with Aki Takase once more.

== Discography ==
As leader/co-leader

- Mountain (Better Days, 1981)
- Zoomin' with Motohiko Hino, Kazumasa Akiyama, Naoki Kitajima, Kenji Nishiyama (Better Days, 1982)
- In A Sentimental Mood with Takehiro Honda, Takeo Moriyama (CBS/Sony, 1985)
- Ten i mu ho with Aki Takase (Mobys, 1985)
- Duet with Lester Bowie (Paddle Wheel, 1985)
- My Funny Valentine with Takehiro Honda, Takeo Moriyama (Sony Music, 1985)
- Reason For Being with Masayuki Takayanagi (Jinya Disc, 1992)
- October Bass Tri-Logue with Barre Phillips, Tetsu Saitoh (PLJ, 2001) – recorded in 2000
- Bass Duet with Tetsu Saitoh (Senkoji, 2005)
- Rostbeständige Zeit with Kazuo Imai, Axel Dörner, Noritaka Tanaka (Doubtmusic, 2010)[2CD] – recorded in 2008
- SoNAISH Gut Bass Duo with Tetsu Saitoh (Sonaish, 2011) – recorded in 2005
- Kami Fusen with Itaru Oki, Choi Sun Bae (NoBusiness, 2017)
- Live at Jazz Inn Lovely 1990 with Masayuki Takayanagi, Masabumi Kikuchi (NoBusiness, 2020) – live recorded in 1990
