= Hideto Kanai =

Hideto Kanai (金井 英人, Kanai Hideto, March 17, 1931 – April 8, 2011) was a Japanese jazz double-bassist. He was born in Tokyo.

Kanai began playing bass in 1950, joining Fumio Nanri's ensemble the following year. He was one of the founders of the avant-garde collective Shinseiki Ongaku Kenkyusyo, co-founded the Jazz Academy, and was the leader of Kings Lore Orchestra from 1966 to 1974. Among those who were associated with Kanai's scene were Terumasa Hino, Takeshi Inomata, Masabumi Kikuchi, Norio Maeda, Masayuki Takayanagi, Masahiko Togashi, Sadao Watanabe, Yosuke Yamashita and Allan Praskin. In 1984 he cofounded the Japanese Bass Players Club with Isao Suzuki.

Kanai died on April 8, 2011.
