= 1961 – Toshiko Akiyoshi =

Compilation album by Toshiko Akiyoshi
- Released: 2001
- Recorded: Tokyo, 1961 February, March
- Genre: Jazz
- Length: 68:15
- Label: King Records (Japan)

1961 – Toshiko Akiyoshi is a compilation (effectively a combined re-issue of 2 albums) of previous Toshiko Akiyoshi recordings from 1961. All 5 tracks from the Asahi Sonorama releases, Long Yellow Road (also released as Tosiko Akiyosi Recital) as well as all 6 tracks from the King Records release Toshiko Meets Her Old Pals are contained on this album. All of these tracks, along with those of many other artists, are also included on the 12-CD box set, A History of King Jazz Recordings.

== Track listing ==
1. "Long Yellow Road" (Akiyoshi) – 5:39
2. "Hakone Twilight" (Akiyoshi) – 5:35
3. "Kisarazu Jinku" (木更津甚句) (traditional) – 5:49
4. "Solveig's Song" (Grieg) – 5:53
5. "Deep River" (traditional) – 5:12
6. "So What" (Davis) – 10:48
7. "The Night Has a Thousand Eyes" (Brainin) – 5:00
8. "Donna Lee" (Parker) – 5:50
9. "Quebec" (Mariano) – 6:19
10. "Old Pals" (Akiyoshi) – 5:02
11. "Watasu No Biethovin" (Akiyoshi) – 7:08

== Personnel ==
Tracks 1~5:

- Toshiko Akiyoshi – piano
- Eddie Marshall – drums
- Gene Cherico – bass

Tracks 6~11:

- Toshiko Akiyoshi – piano
- Sadao Watanabe – alto saxophone
- Akira Miyazawa – tenor saxophone
- Masanaga Harada – bass (tracks 6, 7, 10, 11)
- Hachiro Kurita – bass (tracks 8, 9)
- Masahiko Togashi – drums (tracks 6, 7)
- Hideo Shiraki – drums (tracks 8, 9)
- Takeshi Inomata – drums (tracks 10, 11)

== References / external links ==
- KICJ 195 1961: Toshiko Akiyoshi, King Records (Japan) 8247
- KICJ 9031-9042 A History of King Jazz Recordings (20世紀日本ジャズ大系) 12-CD box set.
- Allmusic
