= Pete Yellin =

American jazz saxophonist and educator

- Born: Peter Michael Yellin; July 18, 1941; New York City, U.S.
- Died: April 13, 2016 (aged 74) Berkeley, California
- Genres: Jazz, big band
- Occupations: Musician, educator
- Instrument: Saxophone
- Years active: 1960–2007
- Label: Mainstream
- Website: www.peteyellin.net

Peter Michael Yellin (July 18, 1941 – April 13, 2016) was an American jazz saxophonist and educator.

== Career ==
A native of New York City, Yellin received piano lessons from his father, who was a staff pianist for NBC. He began playing saxophone in the late 1950s after hearing Art Pepper. He studied music at the Juilliard School and Brooklyn College.

During the 1960s, Yellin worked with Chick Corea, Lionel Hampton, Buddy Rich, and Tito Puente. In the 1970s, he was a member of Joe Henderson's band and worked with Mario Bauzá, Charles Earland, Maynard Ferguson, Sam Jones, and the Thad Jones/Mel Lewis Orchestra. He started his own group in 1974. During the 1980s and 1990s, he worked with George Benson, Eddie Palmieri, and Bob Mintzer. Yellin played with Mintzer's big band from its origin in 1984 until 2007, when he moved to California.

Four years later, he suffered the first of several strokes that would end his life in 2016. He taught jazz at Long Island University, establishing its program in 1984 and leading it through the 1990s.

== Discography ==
=== As leader ===
- Dance of Allegra (Mainstream, 1972)
- It's the Right Thing (Mainstream, 1973)
- Colors of Brooklyn with Brooklyn Jazz Machine (Alfa, 1993)
- It's You or No One (Mons, 1996)
- Live! (Jazz4Ever, 1995)
- Mellow Soul (Metropolitan, 1998)
- How Long Has This Been Going On? (Jazzed Media, 2008)

=== As sideman ===
With Lionel Hampton

- Hamp Stamps (Glad-Hamp, 1981)
- Top Jazz (Sarpe, 1990)
- Hamp's Boogie (LaserLight, 1998)
- We Are the Levitt's (esp-disk, 1968)

With Joe Henderson

- In Pursuit of Blackness (Milestone, 1971)
- Big Band (Verve, 1996)
- In Pursuit of Blackness & Black Is the Color (Milestone, 1998)

With Bob Mintzer

- Incredible Journey (DMP, 1985)
- Camouflage (DMP, 1986)
- Art of the Big Band (DMP, 1991)
- Departure (DMP, 1993)
- Only in New York (DMP, 1994)
- Big Band Trane (DMP, 1996)
- Live at the Berlin Jazz Festival (Basic, 1996)
- Latin from Manhattan (DMP, 1998)
- Papa Lips (CBS/Sony, 1983)
- Spectrum (DMP, 1988)
- Urban Contours (DMP, 1989)
- Homage to Count Basie (DMP, 2000)
- Gently (DMP, 2002)
- Live at MCG with Special Guest Kurt Elling (MCG, 2004)
- Old School New Lessons (MCG, 2006)
- Swing Out (MCG, 2008)

With Tito Puente

- The Mambo King: 100th LP (RMM, 1991)
- Live at Birdland: Dancemania '99 (RMM, 1998)
- Mambo Birdland (RMM, 1999)
- Masterpiece & Obra Maestra (Universal, 2000)

With Buddy Rich

- Swingin' New Big Band (Pacific Jazz, 1966)
- Big Band Machine (Groove Merchant, 1975)
- Ease On Down the Road (Denon, 1987)
- Two Big Bands Play Selections from West Side Story & Other Delights (LRC, 1991)

With others

- Mario Bauza, 944 Columbus (Messido, 1994)
- Sam Jones, Something New (Interplay, 1979)
- Eddie Palmieri, Vamonos Pa'l Monte (Tico, 1971)
- Sadao Watanabe & Terumasa Hino, Sadao Watanabe vs Terumasa Hino (Canyon, 1980)
