= Higashihara =

Higashihara (written: 東原 lit. "east plain") is a Japanese surname. Notable people with the surname include:

- Aki Higashihara (東原 亜希, born 1982), Japanese television personality, model and gravure idol
- Rikiya Higashihara (東原 力哉, born 1956), Japanese jazz drummer
