= Teruo Nakamura (musician) =

Japanese jazz bassist and producer

Teruo Nakamura (中村 照夫, Nakamura Teruo, born 3 March 3, 1942) is a Japanese jazz bassist and record producer.

== Early life ==
Nakamura was born in Tokyo on 3 March 1942. Everyone in his immediate family were artists. He studied at Nihon University before moving to New York in 1964. He studied there with Reggie Workman.

== Later life and career ==
Nakamura in 1969 joined drummer Roy Haynes's ensemble; that same year he also formed a band with Steve Grossman and Lenny White, who both went on to play on his debut as a leader, 1973's Unicorn. Nakamura played both acoustic and electric bass on the album, which was recorded in 1973 and released by Three Blind Mice.

Nakamura formed the Rising Sun band in the mid-1970s. In 1977 this contained saxophonist Bob Mintzer, guitarist Shiro Mori, with Mark Gray on synthesizer, Art Gore on drums and Nobu Urushiyama on percussion. "Nakamura worked principally as a record producer in the 1980s and 1990s."

== Discography ==
=== As leader ===
- Unicorn (Three Blind Mice, 1973)
- Rising Sun (Polydor, 1976)
- Manhattan Special (Polydor, 1977)
- Songs of the Birds (Kitty, 1977)
- Big Apple (Agharta, 1979)
- Teruo Nakamura & Rising Sun Band at Carnegie Hall (Agharta, 1979)
- Route 80 (Agharta, 1980)
- Super Friends (Eastworld, 1985)
- Wind Smile (Pony Canyon, 1990)
- Red Shoes (Avex, 2001)

=== As sideman ===
With Roy Haynes

- Hip Ensemble (Mainstream, 1971)
- Togyu (RCA, 1975)

With Tsuyoshi Yamamoto

- P.S. I Love You (Toshiba EMI, 1980)

Main source:
