= Tatsuya Takahashi =

Tatsuya Takahashi may refer to:

- Tatsuya Takahashi (saxophonist) (1931–2008), Japanese jazz saxophonist
- Tatsuya Takahashi (engineer) (born 1983 or 1984), Japanese music engineer
