= Fumio Karashima =

Japanese jazz pianist

- Birth name: Fumio Karashima (辛島文雄, Karashima Fumio)
- Born: 9 March 1948; Oita, Japan
- Died: 24 February 2017 (aged 68); Tokyo, Japan
- Genres: Jazz
- Occupation: Musician
- Instrument: Piano
- Years active: 1975–2017
- Website: www.pit-inn.com/karashima/en/

Fumio Karashima (辛島文雄, Karashima Fumio, 9 March 1948 – 24 February 2017) was a Japanese jazz pianist.

== Life and career ==
Karashima began playing the piano at the age of three. His father was a music teacher at Kyushu University; Karashima attended the same university. He stayed in New York in 1973, but returned to Japan the next year. In 1975 he joined drummer George Ohtsuka's band. In 1980 he joined Elvin Jones' Jazz Machine, and stayed for five years, including for tours of Europe and the United States. He then switched to being principally a solo pianist, but also led a quintet from 1988 to 1991. During the 1990s he frequently toured internationally. He died of cancer on 24 February 2017.

== Discography ==
An asterisk (*) after the year indicates that it is the year of release.

=== As leader/co-leader ===
Year recorded	Title	Label	Notes
2015*	Everything I Love	Pit Inn	Solo piano
2014*	A Time for Love	Pit Inn	Trio, with Satsuki Kusui (bass), Nobuyuki Komatsu (drums)
2012*	Summertime	Pit Inn	Quintet, with Atsushi Ikeda and Masanori Okazaki (sax), Satsuk Kusui (bass), Nobuyuki Komastsu (drums)
2010*	E.J. Blues	Pit Inn	Quartet, with Masanori Okazaki (sax), Ryu Kawamura (bass), Takeo Moriyama (drums)
2008	Moon River	VideoArts	Solo piano
2005	Great Time	VideoArts	Trio, with Drew Gress (bass), Jack DeJohnette (drums)
2003	It's Just Beginning	VideoArts	Trio, with Yosuke Inoue (bass), Shingo Okudaira (drums)
2002	Grand New Touch	VideoArts	Duo, with Kei Akagi (piano)
2001	The Elysian Air	VideoArts	Trio, with Yosuke Inoue (bass), Shingo Okudaira (drums)
1999*	Rencontre	Emarcy, Polydor Japan	Duet, with Toots Thielemans
1983	Round Midnight	Absord	Quartet, with Larry Coryell (guitar), Ikuo Sakurai (bass), Motohiko Hino (drums)
1982	Elegant Evening	Absord	Trio, with Ikuo Sakurai (bass), Motohiko Hino (drums)
1981	A Child in the Wind	Absord	Trio, with Richard Davis (bass), George Ohtsuka (drums)
1980	Sho	Absord	Trio, with Nobuyoshi Ino (bass), George Ohtsuka (drums)
1978	Hot Islands	Absord	Quartet, with Mabumi Yamaguchi (sax), Miroslav Vitouš (bass), George Ohtsuka (drums)
1978	Moonflower	Absord	Trio, with Andy McCloud (bass), Elvin Jones (drums)
1977	Gathering	Three Blind Mice	Most tracks trio, with Isao Suzuki (bass), George Ohtsuka (drums); one track solo piano
1977	Landscape	Whynot	Trio, with George Mraz (bass), Motohiko Hino (drums)
1975	Piranha	Whynot	Trio, with Isao Suzuki (bass), Jimmy Hopps (drums)
