= Naniwa =

Naniwa (Japanese: なにわ, なには, ナニワ, 難波, 浪速, 浪花, 浪華) may refer to:

== People with the given name ==
- Kawashima Naniwa (川島 浪速; 1865-1949), Japanese spy
- Gran Naniwa (愚乱・浪花; 1977–2010), ring name of Yoshikuni Kimura, japanese professional wrestler
- Princess Naniwa no Ono (難波小野王; ? – 489), Empress of Japan
- Chieko Naniwa (浪花 千栄子; 1907–1973), Japanese actress

== Music ==
- Naniwa Danshi, Japanese boy band
- Naniwa Express, Japanese jazz fusion group

== Places ==
- Naniwa-kyō, the place that became the modern Japanese city of Osaka
- Naniwa-ku, Osaka, one of the 24 wards of Osaka City, Japan

== Other uses ==
- Naniwa Kin'yūdō, Japanese manga
- Naniwa Maru, replica ship of a typical Japanese trader
- Japanese cruiser Naniwa, the first protected cruiser built specifically for the Imperial Japanese Navy

== See also ==
- Namba
