= Allan Praskin =

American jazz musician (born 1948)

Allan Conrad Praskin
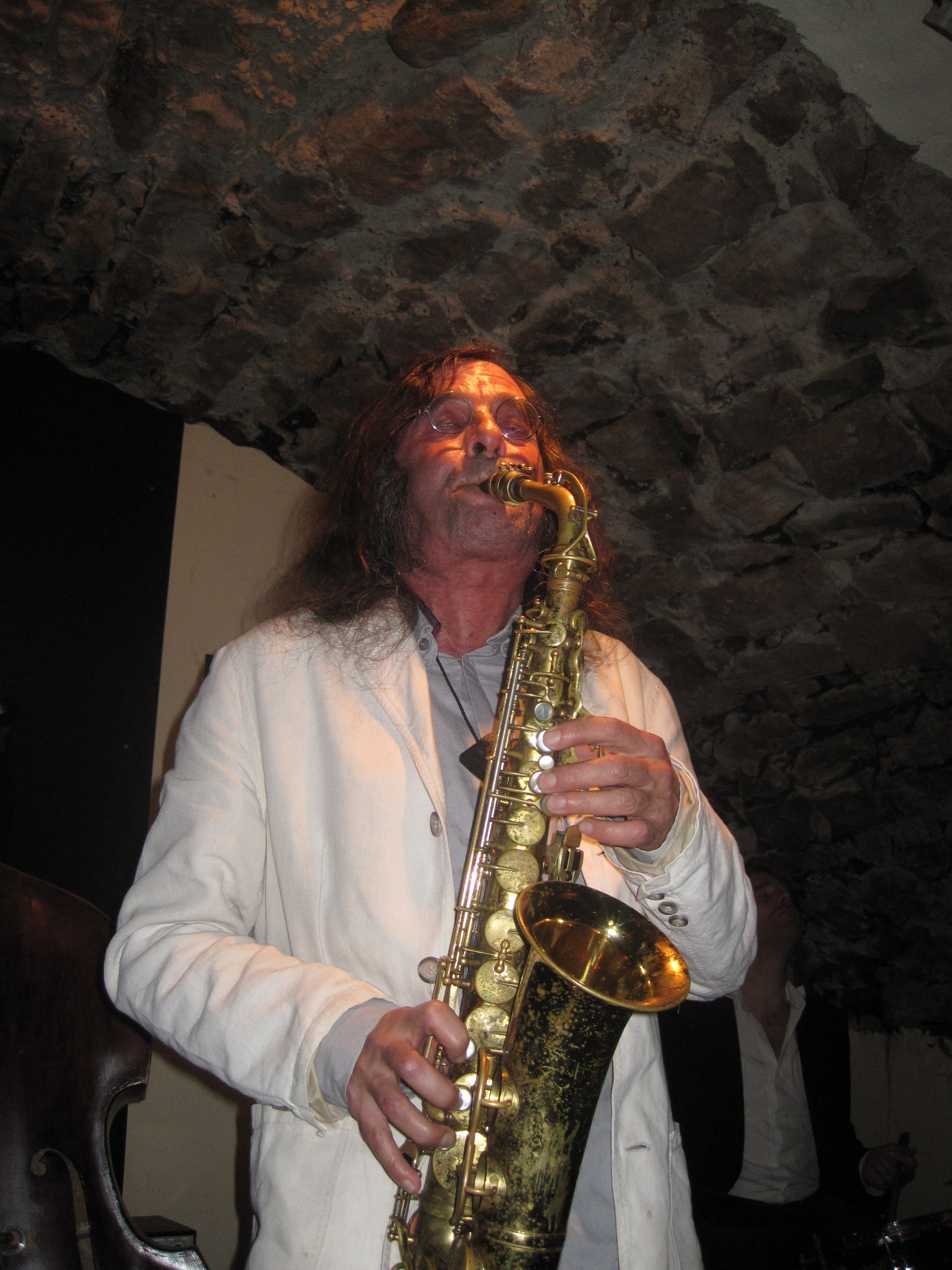
- Allan Praskin, 2010

Background information
- Born: December 17, 1948 (age 77); Los Angeles, United States
- Genres: Jazz
- Occupation: Musician
- Instrument: Alto saxophone

Allan Conrad Praskin (December 17, 1948, in Los Angeles) is an American jazz musician (alto saxophone player, composer and bandleader). He has been living in Europe for more than 30 years.

== Life and works ==
Praskin had clarinette lessons when he was very young. But soon, he became acquainted with jazz through his father's record collection, which induced him to finally to change his main instrument to alto saxophone. He had his first practical experience of improvised music when he was a teenager in his home city of Los Angeles, where the jazz scene was very lively at that time. He became acquainted with modern jazz under George Morrow's aegis (the bass player in the Clifford Brown/Max Roach quintet). During his lessons under Morrow, he got to know other prominent musicians who lived in California, such as Bobby Hutcherson, J. R. Monterose and Harold Land -- whom he also worked with.

At the end of the 1960s -- at an important time in the Vietnam War -- Praskin was conscripted into the army, but he was sent to Korea and not to Indochina. During his short stay in Tokyo in 1971, his first LP record, Encounter, was published on Three Blind Mice. He also played as a sideman on Hideto Kanai's record Q.

As a result, he came into contact with the flourishing free jazz scene of New York City. He made a name for himself very soon among the avant-garde in the metropole through jam sessions and recordings with leading musicians such as Sunny Murray, Beaver Harris and Sam Rivers.

Gunter Hampel joined Praskin in 1972 for his Galaxie Dream Band. Praskin was a member of the band until 1975. As a member of this band, he made an extensive tour through Europe in 1973, where he eventually moved. During the following years, he turned to his musical interest, the old style of jazz, without quitting his experiences from the free playing style. This led to his collaboration with artists of different styles like Barbara Dennerlein (organist), Özay Fecht (singer), Fritz Pauer (pianist), Branislav Lala Kovačev (percussion player), Warne Marsh (saxophone player), and Hans Koller (saxophone player). Many years of musical partnership connected Praskin with the pianists Wolfgang Köhler and Larry Porter. Along with Porter, he led the Porter/Praskin quartet from 1984 to 1993. The quartet had different casts and made several notable recordings. The collaboration with Köhler began in the group Just Friends in the 1970s. This collaboration has continued to the present day.
