= Nanri =

Nanri (written: 南里) is a Japanese surname. Notable people with the surname include:

- Fumio Nanri (南里 文夫, 1910–1975), Japanese jazz trumpeter
- Yasuharu Nanri (南里 康晴, born 1985), Japanese figure skater
- Yūka Nanri (南里 侑香, born 1984), Japanese voice actress and singer
