= Akitoshi =

- Gender: Male

Origin
- Origin: Japanese
- Meaning: Different meanings depending on the kanji used

Akitoshi (written: 彰敏, 彰俊, 秋敏 or 明要) is a masculine Japanese given name. Notable people with the name include:

- Akitoshi Igarashi (五十嵐 明要; born 1932), Japanese jazz saxophonist
- Akitoshi Kawazu (河津 秋敏; born 1962), Japanese video game designer
- Akitoshi Saito (斎藤 彰俊; born 1965), Japanese professional wrestler
- Akitoshi Tamura (田村 彰敏; born 1980), Japanese mixed martial artist
- Yoshinotani Akitoshi (吉の谷 彰俊; 1949–2000), Japanese sumo wrestler
