= Terumasa Hino =

Japanese jazz trumpeter (born 1942)

- Born: October 25, 1942 (age 84); Tokyo, Japan
- Genres: Jazz, jazz fusion, avant-garde jazz
- Occupation: Musician
- Instruments: Trumpet, flügelhorn
- Years active: 1955–present
- Labels: Columbia, RCA, Enja, Blue Note, Pony Canyon, Space Shower Music
- Website: terumasahino.com

Terumasa Hino (日野 皓正, Hino Terumasa; born October 25, 1942) is a Japanese jazz trumpeter. He is considered one of Japan's finest jazz musicians. His instruments include the trumpet, cornet, and flügelhorn.

== Early life ==
He was born in Tokyo, Japan, and his father was a trumpeter and tap dancer. Hino started tap dancing at age four and playing trumpet at age nine. As a teenager, he transcribed solos by Clifford Brown, Miles Davis, Freddie Hubbard, and Lee Morgan.

== Career ==
In the 1950s, Hino began his career as a professional jazz musician, inspired by Fumio Nanri and Hiroshi Sakaue. In 1965, he joined Hideo Shiraki's Quintet, with whom he stayed until 1969, leaving to lead his own band full-time, which he started in 1964.

He released his first solo album Alone, Alone and Alone (1967) and a group album, Hino-Kikuchi Quintet (1968), with pianist Masabumi Kikuchi. In 1969, Hino released Hi-nology to critical acclaim. He collaborated with the Flower Travellin' Band for the 1970 single "Crash". Soon after, Hino performed in several jazz festivals and clubs, such as the Berliner Jazztage in 1971 and Munich Jazzclub in 1973. He worked with Kikuchi in 1974 before settling in New York City.

He moved toward funk, free jazz, and avant-garde jazz on the albums Into the Heaven (1970), Vibrations (1971), and Journey Into My Mind (1974). Beginning in the 1980s, Hino spent more time in Japan and started playing cornet. He has worked with Randy Brecker, Gil Evans, Hal Galper, Eddie Gomez, Eddie Harris, Elvin Jones, Sam Jones, Joachim Kuhn, David Liebman, Harvey Mason Jr., Jackie McLean, Airto Moreira, Bob Moses, Alphonse Mouzon, George Mraz, Greg Osby, Nana Vasconcelos and Mal Waldron.

== Honors ==
- 2014: Medal of Honor with Purple Ribbon (紫綬褒章 (しじゅほうしょう))
- 2019: Order of the Rising Sun, Gold Rays with Rosette (勲四等旭日小綬章)

== Discography ==
=== As leader/co-leader ===
- Beautiful Trumpet (Polydor, 1967)
- Alone, Alone and Alone (Columbia, 1967)
- Feelin' Good (Takt/Columbia, 1968)
- Hi-Nology (Columbia, 1969)
- Swing Journal Jazz Workshop 1 Terumasa Hino Concert (Takt/Columbia, 1969) – recorded in 1968
- Hino-Kikuchi Quintet with Masabumi Kikuchi (Takt/Columbia, 1969)
- Journey to Air (Love, 1970)
- Alone Together (Takt/Columbia, 1970)
- Into the Heaven (Takt/Columbia, 1970)
- Hino at Berlin Jazz Festival '71 (Victor, 1971)
- Hino Story (Takt/Columbia, 1971)
- Love Nature (Canyon/Love, 1971)
- Peace and Love (Canyon/Love, 1971)
- A Part (Canyon/Love, 1971)
- Vibrations with Heinz Sauer (Enja, 1971)
- Fuji (Victor, 1972)
- Live! (Three Blind Mice, 1973)
- Taro's Mood (Enja, 1973)
- Journey into My Mind (CBS/Sony, 1973)
- Into Eternity (CBS/Sony, 1974)
- Mas Que Nada (RCA, 1975)
- Live in Concert (East Wind, 1975)
- Speak to Loneliness (East Wind, 1975)
- Hogiuta (East Wind, 1976)
- Now Hear This (Enja, 1977)
- May Dance (Flying Disk, 1977)
- Hip Seagull (Flying Disk, 1978)
- Wheel Stone Live in Nemuro (East Wind, 1979)
- City Connection (Flying Disk, 1979)
- Horizon (CBS/Sony, 1979)
- Daydream (Flying Disk, 1980)
- Wheel Stone Live in Nemuro Vol. 2 (East Wind, 1981)
- Double Rainbow (CBS/Sony, 1981)
- Pyramid (CBS/Sony, 1982)
- New York Times (CBS/Sony, 1983)
- Trans-Blue (CBS/Sony, 1985)
- Trade Wind (CBS/Sony, 1986)
- Detour (EMI, 1988)
- Bluestruck (Somethin' Else, 1989)
- Live in Warsaw (Century, 1991)
- From the Heart (Blue Note, 1991)
- Blue Smiles (Somethin' Else, 1992)
- Triple Helix (Somethin' Else, 1993)
- Spark (Somethin' Else, 1994)
- Acoustic Boogie (Somethin' Else, 1995)
- Moment (Somethin' Else, 1996)
- Transfusion (SME, 2000)
- D.N.A (Sony, 2001)
- D-N-A Live in Tokyo (Sony, 2002)
- Here We Go Again (Sony, 2003)
- Dragon (Sony, 2005)
- Crimson (Sony, 2006)
- Weakness in Execution (寂光) (Sony, 2008)
- Aftershock (Sony, 2011)
- Mr. Happiness & Slipped Out (Super Fuji, 2012)
- Jazz Acoustic Machine with J.A.M. (Victor, 2012)
- Beyond the Mirage (Space Shower Music, 2019)

=== As sideman ===
With Toshiko Akiyoshi

- Jazz in Japan Recorded in Tokyo (Vee Jay, 1965)
- Last Live in Blue Note Tokyo (Wounded Bird, 2011)

With Richie Beirach

- Ayers Rock (Polydor, 1985)
- Richard Beirach/Terumasa Hino/Masahiko Togashi (Konnex, 1993)
- Zal (Absord, 1999)

With Johnny Hartman

- Hartman Meets Hino (Capitol, 1973)
- For Trane (Blue Note, 1995)

With Motohiko Hino

- Wild Talk (Meldac, 1990)
- Sailing Stone (Gramavision, 1992)
- It's There (Fun House, 1993)

With Masabumi Kikuchi

- All About Dancing Mist (Philips, 1971)
- East Wind (East Wind, 1974)
- Susto (CBS/Sony, 1981)
- One-Way Traveller (CBS/Sony, 1982)

With Dave Liebman

- Doin' It Again (Timeless, 1980)
- If They Only Knew (Timeless, 1981)

With Bob Moses

- Family (Sutra, 1980)
- When Elephants Dream of Music (Gramavision, 1983)
- Wheels of Colored Light (Open Minds, 1992)
- Devotion (Soul Note, 1996)

With Hideo Shiraki

- Sakura Sakura (SABA, 1965)
- Boomerang Baby (Express, 1980)

With Mal Waldron

- Reminiscent Suite (Victor, 1973)
- Moods (Enja, 1978)

With Sadao Watanabe

- Sadao Plays Bacharach and Beatles (Takt/Columbia, 1969)
- Swing Journal Jazz Workshop 2 - Dedicated To Charlie Parker (Takt/Columbia, 1969)
- Mbali Africa (CBS/Sony, 1974)
- Echo (CBS/Sony, 1979) – rec. 1969, 74
- Sadao Watanabe vs. Terumasa Hino (Canyon, 1980)

With others

- Eddie Daniels, This Is New (Takt/Columbia, 1968)
- Nathan Davis, Faces of Love (Tomorrow, 1982)
- Bob Degen, Children of the Night (Enja, 1978)
- The Eleventh House, Aspects (Arista, 1976)
- Gil Evans, Little Wing (Circle, 1978)
- Hal Galper, Now Hear This (Enja, 1977)
- Carlos Garnett, The New Love (Muse, 1978)
- Nobuo Hara, The 20th Anniversary Concert (CBS/Sony, 1972)
- Joe Henderson, In Concert (Philips, 1971)
- Mieko Hirota, Step Across (CBS/Sony, 1978)
- Takeshi Inomata, Modern Punch for You (King, 1978)
- Kimiko Itoh, For Lovers Only (CBS 1987)
- Carter Jefferson, The Rise of Atlantis (Timeless, 1979)
- Elvin Jones, Earth Jones (Palo Alto, 1982)
- Sam Jones, Visitation (SteepleChase, 1978)
- Kimiko Kasai, New Pastel (CBS/Sony, 1984)
- George Kawaguchi, Jazz Battle (King, 1991)
- Joachim Kuhn, Hip Elegy (MPS/BASF, 1976)
- Mikio Masuda, Trace (East Wind, 1974)
- Malcolm McNeill, I'm Shadowing You (EMI, 1989)
- Ken McIntyre, Introducing the Vibrations (SteepleChase, 1977)
- Alphonse Mouzon & Larry Coryell, The 11th House (Metronome, 1985)
- Alphonse Mouzon, The Sky Is the Limit (Tenacious, 1996)
- Naniwa Express, Silent Savanna (CBS/Sony, 1985)
- Tim Ries, Stones World (Sunnyside, 2008)
- George Russell, New York Big Band (Soul Note, 1982)
- Shungo Sawada, This Is Bossa Nova (CBS 1968)
- John Scofield, John Scofield (Trio, 1978)
- Masayuki Takayanagi, Ginparis Session June 26, 1963 (Three Blind Mice, 1971)
- Masahiko Togashi, Golden Circle "6" (Trial, 1999)[2CD]
- Robert Watson, Estimated Time of Arrival (Roulette, 1978)
