= Toshiko Meets Her Old Pals =

Live album by Toshiko Akiyoshi
- Released: 1961
- Recorded: 7, 8 March 1961 (Suginami), 27 March 1961 (Bunkyō)
- Venue: Suginami Public Hall and Bunkyō Public Hall, Tokyo
- Genre: Jazz
- Label: King Records

Toshiko Akiyoshi chronology
Long Yellow Road (Trio) (1961)	Toshiko Meets Her Old Pals (1961)	Live at Birdland (1961)

The jazz album Toshiko Meets Her Old Pals (Japanese Title: 敏子 / 旧友に会う) was recorded by pianist Toshiko Akiyoshi in Tokyo in March 1961 and released by King Records in Japan. All tracks from this album as well as 1961's Long Yellow Road (Trio) were later combined on a single album released by King Jazz as 1961 - Toshiko Akiyoshi, a History of King Jazz Recordings.

== Track listing ==
LP side A

1. "So What" (Davis) – 10:50
2. "The Night Has a Thousand Eyes" (Brainin) – 5:00
3. "Donna Lee" (Parker) – 5:50

LP side B

1. "Quebec" (Mariano) – 6:17
2. "Old Pals" (Akiyoshi) – 5:01
3. "Watasu No Biethovin" (Akiyoshi) – 7:10

== Personnel ==
- Toshiko Akiyoshi (秋吉敏子) – piano
- Sadao Watanabe (渡辺貞夫) – alto saxophone
- Akira Miyazawa (宮沢昭) – tenor saxophone
- Masanaga Harada (原田政長) – bass (tracks A1, 2, B2, 3)
- Hachiro Kurita (栗田八郎) – bass (tracks A3, B1)
- Masahiko Togashi (富樫雅彦) – drums (tracks A1, 2)
- Hideo Shiraki (白木秀雄) – drums (tracks A3, B1)
- Takeshi Inomata (猪俣猛) – drums (tracks B2, 3)

== References / External links ==
- Allmusic
- King SKC-3
