= Multiple (album) =

Studio album by Joe Henderson
- Released: 1973
- Recorded: January 30–31, 1973; February & April 1973
- Studio: Mercury Sound Studios, New York
- Genre: Hard bop, post-bop, jazz fusion
- Length: 41:42
- Label: Milestone; MSP 9050
- Producer: Orrin Keepnews

Joe Henderson chronology
Black Is the Color (1972)	Multiple (1973)	The Elements (1973)

Multiple is an album by American saxophonist Joe Henderson, released in 1973 on Milestone. It was recorded mainly on January 30–31, 1973, but producer Keepnews stated there had also been a couple of additional recordings in February and April. The musicians involved include keyboardist Larry Willis, guitarist James “Blood” Ulmer, bassist Dave Holland and drummer Jack DeJohnette.

Professional ratings
Review scores
Source	Rating
Allmusic	4.5/5 stars
The Rolling Stone Jazz Record Guide	2/5 stars
The Penguin Guide to Jazz Recordings	3/4 stars

== Track listing ==
All pieces by Joe Henderson, unless otherwise noted.

1. "Tress-Cun-Deo-La" – 10:36
2. "Bwaata" (DeJohnette) – 10:56
3. "Song for Sinners" – 6:26
4. "Turned Around" (Holland) – 6:39
5. "Me, Among Others" – 7:05

Basic tracks recorded on January 30 (1, 2, 5) and 31 (3–4), 1973. Overdubs recorded on February 2, April 5 and 13, 1973.

== Personnel ==
- Joe Henderson – tenor saxophone (1–5), soprano saxophone (1), percussion (1, 3), flutes (1), vocals (1, 3)
- Larry Willis – electric piano, ring modulator, Echoplex
- James Ulmer (1), John Thomas (3) – guitar
- Dave Holland – bass, electric bass
- Jack DeJohnette – drums
- Arthur Jenkins – congas, percussion
