= Takashi Furuya =

Japanese jazz saxophonist and vocalist (1936–2020)

Takashi Furuya (February 13, 1936 – September 2, 2020) was a Japanese jazz saxophonist and vocalist.

== Biography ==
Takashi Furuya was born in Tokyo on February 13, 1936. He played violin and clarinet in his youth, and picked up saxophone as a teenager. He played on American military bases in the 1950s and led his own bands starting in 1959. These ensembles had several names, including Takashi Furuya and the Freshmen, The Concord, Reunion, the Neighborhood Big Band, and Neo Sax Band. He accompanied visiting American musicians on tours of Japan, including Dizzy Gillespie, Mal Waldron, and Phil Woods. He has worked as a sideman for Gil Evans, Naosuke Miyamoto, and Makoto Ozone, and also collaborated with Fumio Karashima, Kiyoshi Kitagawa, and Rikiya Higashihara.

Furuya died on September 2, 2020, at the age of 84.
