= Masaru Imada =

Japanese jazz pianist and composer (1932–2025)

- Birth name: Masaru Imada (今田勝, Imada Masaru)
- Born: 21 March 1932; Tokyo, Japan
- Died: 30 May 2025 (aged 93)
- Genres: Jazz
- Occupation(s): Musician, composer
- Instrument: Piano
- Website: imadamasaru.com

Masaru Imada (今田勝, Imada Masaru; 21 March 1932 – 30 May 2025) was a Japanese jazz pianist and composer.

== Life and career ==
Imada was born in Tokyo on 21 March 1932. He had classical piano lessons. He played jazz in student bands while a student at Meiji University, after which he worked in business for a year. He then decided to pursue music professionally. From 1953 he was part of clarinetist Eiji Kitamura's band.

Imada had his own trio from 1964. He formed Now'in, a fusion band, in 1984. He played internationally at jazz festivals from the 1970s.

== Discography ==
An asterisk (*) after the year indicates that it is the year of release.

=== As leader/co-leader ===
Year recorded	Title	Label	Notes
1970*	Maki		Quartet, with tenor sax, bass, drums
1970*	Now!	Three Blind Mice	Quartet, with tenor sax, bass, drums
1973	Poppy	Three Blind Mice	Some tracks solo piano; some tracks trio, with Isao Fukui (bass), Masahiko Ozu (drums)
1975	Green Caterpillar	Three Blind Mice	Quintet, with Kazumi Watanabe (guitar), Isao Fukui (bass), Tetsujiro Obara (drums), Yuji Imamura (percussion)
1976	Masaru Imada Piano	Three Blind Mice	Solo piano
1977	Alone Together	Three Blind Mice	Duo, with George Mraz (bass)
1980	Andalusian Breeze	Trio	With Kazumi Watanabe (guitar), Mitsuaki Furuno (bass), Shinji Mori (drums), Yuji Imamura (percussion)
1981	Carnival	Trio	With Michael Brecker (tenor sax), Randy Brecker (flugelhorn), Kiyoshi Sugimoto (guitar), Akira Okazawa (bass), Yuichi Tokashiki (drums), Yuji Imamura (percussion)
1982*	Seaside		With Grover Washington, Jr. (tenor sax, alto sax, soprano sax, flute), Tom Brown (trumpet), Steve Kahn (guitar), Anthony Jackson (bass), Steve Jordan (drums), Manolo Badrena (percussion)
1986*	Strange Conversation	Polydor	Quartet, with keyboard, bass, drums
1988*	Azure		Sextet
2002*	Standards	Three Blind Mice	
