= Long Yellow Road (Toshiko Akiyoshi Trio album) =

Studio album by Toshiko Akiyoshi
- Released: 1961
- Recorded: February 1961
- Venue: Tokyo
- Genre: Jazz
- Label: Asahi Sonorama

Toshiko Akiyoshi chronology
The Toshiko – Mariano Quartet (1961)	Long Yellow Road (1961)	Toshiko Meets Her Old Pals (1961)

Long Yellow Road and the nearly identical release, Tosiko Akiyosi Recital is a jazz trio recording made by the jazz pianist Toshiko Akiyoshi in Tokyo in February 1961.

== Release history ==
A total of five tracks were recorded at a 1961 February 'recital' in Tokyo and were released by Asahi Sonorama and King Records in various formats and combinations at various times. The first track released, "Solveig's Song", was distributed in Japan as a "sonosheet" (a.k.a. "phonosheet" or Flexi disc) in the 1961 April issue of a monthly Asahi Sonorama music publication. The other four tracks were released a few days later in a special edition sonosheet "book" (Japanese Title: 黄色い長い道、秋吉敏子帰国記念特集 = Long Yellow Road, Toshiko Akiyoshi Homecoming Commemorative Special Edition). A standard LP album version containing all five tracks was released under the title Long Yellow Road (not to be confused with later Toshiko Akiyoshi quartet and big band recordings of the same title, Long Yellow Road). Another version, containing most of the same tracks from the same session, was also released in Japan under the title, Tosiko Akiyosi Recital. All five tracks from the original session as well as all six tracks from 1961's Toshiko Meets Her Old Pals were later combined on a single CD released in Japan by King Records as 1961 - Toshiko Akiyoshi, a History of King Jazz Recordings.

== Track listing ==
LP side A

1. "Long Yellow Road" (Akiyoshi) – 5:35 (b, c, d)
2. "Hakone Twilight" (Akiyoshi) – 5:30 (b, c, later re-release of 'd')
3. "Kisarazu Jinku" (木更津甚句) (traditional) – 5:45 (b, c, d)

LP side B

1. "Solveig's Song" (Grieg) – 5:49 (a, c, d)
2. "Deep River" (traditional) – 5:05 (b, c, d)

a) Sonosheet, Asahi Sonorama 1961 April edition (pub: 1961 March 21)
b) Sonosheet, Asahi Sonorama special edition (pub: 1961 March 30)
c) Long Yellow Road (Asahi Sonorama LP)
d) Tosiko Akiyosi Recital (Asahi Sonorama)

== Personnel ==
- Toshiko Akiyoshi – piano
- Eddie Marshall – drums
- Gene Cherico – double bass
