= Native Son (band) =

Japanese jazz band

Native Son was a Japanese jazz-funk and jazz fusion group.

The group consisted of the following members:

- Hiroshi Murakami
- Kosuke Mine
- Motonobu Ohde
- Takehiro Honda
- Tamio Kawabata
- Hiroshi Fukumura

During their career they released 6 albums.

== Discography ==
- Savanna Hotline (1979, JVC)
- Native Son (1979, JVC)
- Coast To Coast: Live In USA (1980, JVC)
- Shining (1982, JVC)
- Resort - LP (1983, Polydor)
- Gumbo - LP (1984, Polydor)

=== Native Son (1979, JVC) ===
==== Tracklist ====
Side One:

1. Bump Cruising

2. Heat Zone

3. Breezin' & Dreamin'

4. Wind Surfing

Side Two:

1. Whispering Eyes

2. Twilight Mist

3. Super Safari

4. Whispering Eyes (Reprise)

==== Personnel ====
Takehiro Honda: Fender Rhodes Piano, Hohner D-6 Clavinet, Yamaha CP 70 Solina Celesta

Kohsuke Mine: Tenor Saxophone, Soprano Saxophone

Motonobu Ohde: Electric Guitar

Tamio Kawabata: Electric Bass

Hiroshi Murakami: Drums

Damiao Gomes De Souza: Cuica On "Whispering Eyes"

Cover Illustration: Lou Beach
