= Duet (Lester Bowie and Nobuyoshi Ino album) =

Studio album by Lester Bowie & Nobuyoshi Ino
- Released: 1985
- Recorded: August 1 & 2 1985
- Genre: Jazz
- Label: Paddle Wheel
- Producer: Masahiko Yuh

Lester Bowie chronology
I Only Have Eyes for You (1985)	Duet (1985)	Avant Pop (1986)

Duet is an album by trumpeter Lester Bowie and bassist Nobuyoshi Ino recorded in Japan in 1985 and released on the Paddle Wheel label. It features seven duet performances by Bowie and Ino.

== Reception ==
The Allmusic review awarded the album 2 stars.

Professional ratings
Review scores
Source	Rating
Allmusic	2/5 stars

== Track listing ==
1. "Kami-Fusen" (Ino) - 8:54
2. "Moon Over Bourbon Street" (Sting) - 5:45
3. "Fela - Ellen David" (Bowie, Haden, Ino) - 5:46
4. "Baku-No-Akubi" (Ino) 4:37
5. "Wishful Thinking" (Bowie) - 8:01
6. "Three-Legged Race" (Ino) - 3:15
7. "Goin' Home" (Dvořák, arranged Ino) - 4:22
  - Recorded August 1 & 2, 1985 at The Sound Inn, Studio A, Tokyo, Japan.

== Personnel ==
- Lester Bowie – trumpet
- Nobuyoshi Ino – bass, synthesizer
- Kimion Oikawa – Engineer
- Masahiko Yuh – Producer
