= Tokyo Union =

Tatsuya Takahashi and The Tokyo Union (also credited as Tokyo Union Big Band and Tokyo Union Orchestra) 高橋達也と東京ユニオン were one of Japan's best known big bands.

The Tokyo Union was created in 1964, under the leadership of alto-saxophonist Ryusuke Nomura, and as such represents one of Japan's oldest performing jazz ensembles. Tatsuya Takahashi, tenor saxophonist, became the leader in 1966. Under Takahashi's leadership, Tokyo Union has toured internationally including several appearances at the Montreux Jazz Festival, the first being in 1978. Their awards include "Jazz Record of the Year" in 1978 and "Best Big Band" for nine years running in Japan's influential Swing Journal

They traveled to California in 1980, playing with Herbie Hancock, Slide Hampton and Richie Cole, prior to performing at the Monterey Jazz Festival, and then recording their album "Black Pearl" in San Francisco.

== Discography ==
- The Rock Seasons (Express, 1973)
- Scandinavian Suite (Three Blind Mice, 1977)
- Maiden Voyage (Three Blind Mice, 1977)
- The City (Zen, 1979)
- Impression (Audio Lab, 1980)
- Black Pearl (Zen, 1980)
- Up in the Blues (Polydor, 1981)
- Keeping Count (Paddle Wheel, 1986)
- Plays Miles & Gil (Paddle Wheel, 1988)
- Secret Love (Aeolus, 1992)
