= Tsuyoshi Yamamoto =

Japanese musician and composer

- Born: Tsuyoshi Yamamoto (山本剛, Yamamoto Tsuyoshi); 23 March 1948 (age 77); Sado Island, Niigata, Japan
- Genres: Jazz
- Occupations: Musician, composer
- Instrument: Piano
- Website: tsuyoshi-yamamoto.com

Tsuyoshi Yamamoto (山本剛, Yamamoto Tsuyoshi; born 23 March 1948) is a Japanese jazz pianist and composer.

== Life and career ==
Yamamoto was largely self-taught as a pianist, although he did have piano lessons as a child. He attended Nihon University. As a student there, he played professionally, first as an accompanist to pop singer Micky Curtis; they toured Europe in 1967. In 1974, he became house pianist at Misty, a Tokyo jazz club. He also made his recording debut as leader that year. He played major international festivals in the late 1970s. He also "lived in New York for a year, when he performed with Dizzy Gillespie, Carmen McRae, Sam Jones, Billy Higgins, Elvin Jones, and Sonny Stitt, among others."

== Playing style ==
Commenting on Yamamoto's 2008 album What a Wonderful Trio!, Audiophile Audition noted that "Yamamoto seems to favor the very highest reaches of the treble keyboard with great gusto".

== Discography ==
An asterisk (*) after the year indicates that it is the year of release.

=== As leader/co-leader ===
Year recorded	Title	Label	Notes
1974	Midnight Sugar	Three Blind Mice	Trio, with Isao Fukui (bass), Tetsujiro Obara (drums)
1974*	Misty	Three Blind Mice	Trio, with Isao Fukui (bass), Tetsujiro Obara (drums)
1974	Blues For Tee	Three Blind Mice	
1974*	Now's The Time	Three Blind Mice	TBM-29 Isao Suzuki & Sunao Wada With The Tsuyoshi Yamamoto Trio, George Otsuka Quintet
1974*	Live at the Misty	Three Blind Mice	Trio
1974	The In Crowd	Three Blind Mice	TBM-52
1975*	Night And Day	Three Blind Mice	Koji Moriyama With The Tsuyoshi Yamamoto Trio
1975*	Sunny	Frasco	Minami With Tsuyoshi Yamamoto Trio
1976	Life	East Wind	Trio, with Sam Jones (bass), Billy Higgins (drums)
1978*	Blues to East	Philips	Trio, with Tsutomo Okada (bass), Hiroshi Murakami (drums)
1978	Midnight Sun	Three Blind Mice	Trio, with Tsutomo Okada (bass), Keiji Kishida (drums)
1978	Red Gardenia	Philips	Trio, with Toshibumi Kawahata (bass), Keiji Kishida (drums)
1979	Bass Club	King Records	Trio, with Red Mitchell (bass), Isao Suzuki (piccolo bass)
1980*	P.S. I Love You	Toshiba EMI	With Seiichi Nakamura (tenor sax), Jim McNeely (synthesizer), Shinobu Ito (guitar), Teruo Nakamura (bass), Art Gore (drums), Chuggy Carter and Nobu Urushiyama (percussion)
1981*	Zephyr	Concord	With Bob Maize, Jeff Hamilton, Jeff Clayton
1985*	Another Holiday	Warner Bros.	
1999	Speak Low	Venus	Trio, with Tsutomu Okada (bass), Yoshitaka Uematsu (drums)
2001*	Autumn in Seattle	First Impression Music	Trio, with Ken Kaneko (bass), Toshio Osumi (drums)
2008	What a Wonderful Trio!	First Impression Music	Trio, with Hiroshi Kagawa (bass), Toshio Osumi (drums)
2013	Gentle Blues	Venus	Trio, with Hiroshi Kagawa (bass), Toshio Osumi (drums)
2013	What a Wonderful World	Venus	Trio, with Hiroshi Kagawa (bass), Toshio Osumi (drums)

=== As sideman ===
Year recorded	Leader	Title	Label
1977*	Yoshio Otomo	Moon Ray	Three Blind Mice
