= George Otsuka =

Japanese jazz drummer (1937–2020)

Keiji "George" Otsuka (ジョージ大塚, April 6, 1937 – March 10, 2020) was a Japanese jazz drummer.

== Early life ==
On April 6, 1937, Otsuka was born in Tokyo, Japan.

== Career ==
Otsuka first began playing professionally with Sadao Watanabe's quartet toward the end of the 1950s. He worked for several years with Hidehiko Matsumoto in the 1960s, then led his own trio with Hideo Ichikawa, in addition to working with Roy Haynes. He was a member of the Four Drums ensemble which did a tour of Japan in 1970; Jack DeJohnette, Roy Haynes, and Mel Lewis were the other drummers in this group. Otsuka was frequently tapped as a percussionist for Japanese tours of international musicians in the 1970s and 1980s, such as Richie Beirach, Elvin Jones, Kenny Kirkland, John Scofield, Nana Vasconcelos, Miroslav Vitous, Phil Woods, and Reggie Workman. He was also the founder of the trio We Three, with Hiroyuki Takamoto and Hideaki Kanazawa.

== Death ==
He died on March 10, 2020, in a hospital in Suginami, Tokyo at the age of 82.
