= Takehiro Honda =

Japanese musician (born 1945)

Takehiro Honda (本田竹広, Honda Takehiro; August 21, 1945 – January 12, 2006) was a Japanese jazz pianist and band leader.

Honda was born in Miyako, Iwate. He started playing piano at age five and studied at the Kunitachi College of Music, where he played in a quartet with Kazunori Takeda. By 1969 he was recording with a trio under his own name. He performed with Sadao Watanabe in 1973 and then formed the jazz-fusion band Native Son with Kosuke Mine, which toured internationally. Other credits include performing or recording with Hiroshi Murakami, Hiroshi Fukumura, Motohiko Hino, Shigeharu Mukai, Ron Carter, Tony Williams, Eddie Gómez and Eliot Zigmund. His son is jazz musician Tamaya Honda.

He was the brother-in-law of Sadao and Fumio Watanabe.

== Discography ==
- The Trio (Trio, 1970)
- T. Honda Meets Rhythm Section Featuring S. Watanabe (Trio, 1970)
- Jodo (Trio, 1970)
- I Love You (Trio, 1971)
- Flying to the Sky (Trio, 1971)
- This is Honda (Trio, 1972)
- Misty (Trio, 1972)
- What's Going on (Trio, 1973)
- Salaam Salaam (East Wind, 1974)
- Another Departure (Flying Disk, 1977)
- Reaching for Heaven (Flying Disk, 1978)
- It's Great Outside (Flying Disk, 1978)
- In a Sentimental Mood (CBS/Sony, 1985)
- Aguncha (Polydor, 1987)
- Earthian Air (Fun House, 1991)
- See All Kind (Fun House, 1992)
- Earthian All Star Ensemble (Fun House, 1993)
- Boogie-Boga-Boo (Fun House 1995)
- My Funny Valentine (Sony, 2006)
- Earthian Air (BMG/Fun House, 2007)
- Back On My Fingers (BMG/Fun House, 2007)
- Live at Kagoshima USA Vol.1 "Oleo" (Aketa's Disk, 2007)
- Live 1974 (Owl Wing Record, 2020)
