= Rikiya Higashihara =

Japanese jazz drummer

Rikiya Higashihara (東原 力哉, Higashihara Rikiya; born July 19, 1956, in Takamatsu, Kagawa) is a Japanese jazz drummer.

Higashihara began playing drums when he was twelve years old and was playing professionally while still a teenager. In 1977 he became a member of Takehisa Tanaka's trio, and in the 1980s, he worked with Naniwa Express for several years. He also played as a sideman for Toshiyuki Honda, Kazumi Watanabe, and Tiger Okoshi in that decade. Other associations include work with Dennis Chambers, Takashi Furuya, Sadayasu Fuji, Terumasa Hino, Osamu Ichikawa, and Toshihiko Kankawa. He has also led his own sessions, working with, among others, Hirokuni Korekata, Hiroyuki Naniwa, Yoshihiro Naruse, and Junko Onishi.
