= Akira Ishikawa =

Japanese jazz drummer and bandleader

Akira Ishikawa 石川 晶
- Born: November 10, 1934; Yokosuka, Kanagawa, Japan
- Died: February 10, 2002 (aged 67)
- Genres: Jazz, Jazz-rock, Jazz fusion
- Occupation: Bandleader
- Instrument: Drums
- Formerly of: New Pacific, Akira Miyazawa Modern Allstars

Akira Ishikawa (石川 晶, Ishikawa Akira; November 10, 1934 – February 10, 2002) was a Japanese jazz drummer and bandleader.

Ishikawa began his music career with Shin Matsumoto and New Pacific. In the following years he toured with his own formations like Akira Miyazawa Modern Allstars and Toshio Hosaka. In later years he played with Toshiyuki Miyama and his band New Herd; in 1964/65 he recordEd with Miyamas Modern Jazz Highlights and Modern Jukebox. From the late '60s, he recorded under his own name, releasing Soul Session (1969) and The Gentures in Beat Pops (1970), with, among others, Hiromasa Suzuki, Kiyoshi Sugimoto and Masaoki Terakawa. With his band Count Buffaloes, the jazz-rock oriented album Electrum was out in 1970, followed by Drums Concerto (1971), African Rock (1972), Uganda (1972) and Get Up! (1975). He also worked with Yoshiko Goto, Koichi Oki, Kiyoshi Sugimoto (Our Time, 1974) and Akio Sasaki (Berklee Connection, 1980) in the 1970s. In the field of jazz he was involved between 1964 and 1980 in 14 recording sessions.

== Discography ==
- Soul Session (1969)
- The Gentures in Beat Pops (1970)
- Drums Concerto (1971)
- Uganda (1972)
- Dynamic Latin Exotic Sound (1972)
- African Rock (1972)
- Back to Rhythm (1975)
- Get Up! (1975)
- Okinawa (1976)
