= The Toshiko–Mariano Quartet =

1961 studio album by Toshiko Akiyoshi and Charlie Mariano

Toshiko – Mariano Quartet

Studio album by Toshiko Akiyoshi, Charlie Mariano
- Released: 1961
- Recorded: 5 December 1960
- Venue: New York City
- Studio: Nola Penthouse Sound Studios
- Genre: Jazz
- Length: 41:06
- Label: Candid

Toshiko Akiyoshi chronology
| United Notions (1958) | The Toshiko – Mariano Quartet (1961) | Long Yellow Road (1961) |

Charlie Mariano chronology
| Beauties of 1918 (1957) | The Toshiko – Mariano Quartet (1961) | Live at Birdland (1963) |

Professional ratings
Review scores
| Source | Rating |
|---|---|
| AllMusic | 3/5 stars |
| Jazzwise | 3/5 stars |
| The Penguin Guide to Jazz Recordings | 3.5/4 stars |
| Time Magazine | favorable |

The jazz album The Toshiko–Mariano Quartet featuring pianist Toshiko Akiyoshi (identified on the back cover as Toshiko Akiyoshi Mariano) and saxophonist Charlie Mariano was recorded in 1960 and released on the Candid label. This Candid recording is not to be confused with the similarly titled Toshiko–Mariano Quartet (1963), a recording of mostly Leonard Bernstein songs from the musical West Side Story, released on the Takt (Nippon Columbia) label.

== Track listing ==
LP side A

1. "When You Meet Her" (Mariano) – 6:24
2. "Little T" (Mariano) – 13:14

LP side B

1. "Toshiko's Elegy" (Akiyoshi, credited as "Akiyoshi-Mariano") – 8:42
2. "Deep River" (traditional) – 5:35
3. "Long Yellow Road" (Akiyoshi, credited as "Akiyoshi-Mariano") – 7:11

== Personnel ==
- Toshiko Akiyoshi – piano
- Charlie Mariano – alto saxophone
- Eddie Marshall – drums
- Gene Cherico – bass
