= In Pursuit of Blackness =

Studio album / Live album by Joe Henderson
- Released: End of November 1971
- Recorded: May 12, 1971 (#1, 3, 5); Decca Studios, New York City; September 25–26, 1970 (#2, 4); Lighthouse Café, Hermosa Beach
- Genre: Jazz
- Length: 43:19
- Label: Milestone; MSP 9034
- Producer: Orrin Keepnews

Joe Henderson chronology
"If You're Not Part of the Solution, You're Part of the Problem" (1970)	In Pursuit of Blackness (1971)	Joe Henderson in Japan (1971)

In Pursuit of Blackness is an album by the American saxophonist Joe Henderson, released in 1971 on Milestone. It contains three tracks recorded in the studio in 1971 with saxophonist Pete Yellin, trombonist Curtis Fuller, pianist George Cables and the Return to Forever rhythm section of bassist Stanley Clarke and drummer Lenny White, and two tracks recorded live at the Lighthouse Café in 1970 with the live band featured on Henderson’s previous album.

Professional ratings
Review scores
Source	Rating
All About Jazz	(mixed)
AllMusic	3.5/5 stars
DownBeat	5/5 stars
The Rolling Stone Jazz Record Guide	2/5 stars

== Track listing ==
All pieces by Joe Henderson, unless otherwise noted.

1. "No Me Esqueca" – 7:08
2. "Invitation" (Bronisław Kaper) – 7:34
3. "A Shade of Jade" – 7:45
4. "Gazelle" – 7:33
5. "Mind Over Matter" – 13:19

== Personnel ==
- Joe Henderson – tenor saxophone
- Woody Shaw – trumpet (2, 4)
- Curtis Fuller – trombone (1, 3, 5)
- Pete Yellin – alto saxophone, flute, bass clarinet (1, 3, 5)
- George Cables – electric piano
- Ron McClure (2, 4), Stanley Clarke (1, 3, 5) – bass
- Lenny White – drums
- Tony Waters – congas (4)
