= Hiroshi Fukumura =

Japanese jazz musician

Hiroshi Fukumura (福村博) (born February 21, 1949, Tokyo) is a Japanese jazz trombonist.

Fukumura played with Sadao Watanabe for much of the 1970s, excepting a period where he studied in the United States at the New England Conservatory of Music. He led his own quintet, which included Shigeharu Mukai as a sideman, for a studio recording and a live release in 1973. He was a member of Native Son and also worked with Takehiro Honda, Gil Evans, Hidefumi Toki, and others.

== Discography ==
- Morning Flight (Three Blind Mice, 1973)
- Live:First Flight (Trio Records, 1973)
- Hunt Up Wind with Sadao Watanabe (Flying Disk, 1978)
- Nice Day (Insights, 1981)
- Hot Shot (Morning, 1985)
