= Joe Henderson in Japan =

Live album by Joe Henderson
- Released: End of April/early May 1973
- Recorded: August 4, 1971
- Venue: Junk Club, Tokyo
- Genre: Jazz
- Length: 45:02
- Label: Milestone; MSP 9047
- Producer: Orrin Keepnews

Joe Henderson chronology
In Pursuit of Blackness (1971)	Joe Henderson in Japan (1973)	Black Is the Color (1972)

Joe Henderson in Japan is a live album by American saxophonist Joe Henderson, recorded in 1971 at Junk Club in Tokyo, and released on Milestone Records in 1973. Henderson is joined by Japanese musicians Hideo Ichikawa on electric piano, bassist Kunimitsu Inaba and drummer Motohiko Hino.

== Reception ==
Professional ratings
Review scores
Source	Rating
All About Jazz	(very favorable)
AllMusic	4.5/5 stars
DownBeat	4/5 stars
The Penguin Guide to Jazz Recordings	3.5/4 stars
The Rolling Stone Jazz Record Guide	3/5 stars

AllMusic awarded the album with 4.5 stars and its review by Scott Yanow states: "Performing at the Junk Club in Tokyo, Henderson is joined by an all-Japanese rhythm section on lengthy versions of "'Round Midnight," "Blue Bossa," and his two originals "Out 'n' In" and "Junk Blues." Henderson sounds quite inspired throughout the set, and the obscure rhythm section (only Hino is known in the U.S.) really pushes him. An underrated gem."

== Track listing ==
1. "'Round Midnight" (Thelonious Monk) – 12:38
2. "Out 'N' In" (Joe Henderson) – 9:08
3. "Blue Bossa" (Kenny Dorham) – 8:29
4. "Junk Blues" (Joe Henderson) – 14:46

== Personnel ==
- Joe Henderson – tenor saxophone
- Hideo Ichikawa – electric piano
- Kunimitsu Inaba – bass
- Motohiko Hino – drums
