= Sadao Watanabe (musician) =

Japanese jazz musician (born 1933)

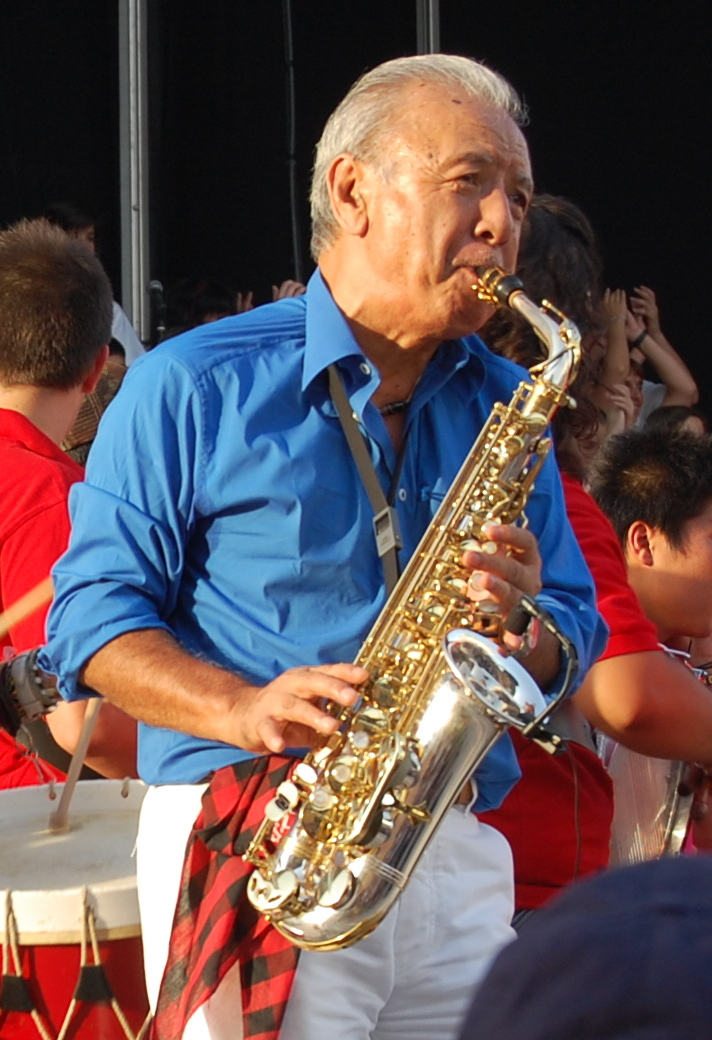
- Watanabe at Expo Zaragoza 2008

Background information
- Born: 1 February 1933 (age 93); Utsunomiya, Tochigi, Japan
- Genres: Jazz, jazz fusion, bossa nova, pop
- Occupation: Musician
- Instruments: Alto saxophone, sopranino saxophone
- Years active: 1953–present
- Website: www.sadao.com

Sadao Watanabe (渡辺 貞夫, Watanabe Sadao; born 1 February 1933) is a Japanese jazz musician who plays alto saxophone and sopranino saxophone. He is known for his bossa nova recordings, although his work encompasses many styles, with collaborations from musicians all over the world.

== Career ==
Watanabe was born on 1 February 1933 in Utsunomiya, Japan. His father, a professional musician, sang and played the biwa. Watanabe was attracted to jazz from an early age, in part due to the strong cultural influence stemming from the American post-war presence in Japan. He learned the clarinet while in high school after convincing his father over the course of six weeks to buy him a second-hand instrument.

In 1951, Watanabe moved to Tokyo and began playing the alto saxophone. He started studying the flute in 1953 with Ririko Hayashi from the Tokyo Philharmonic Orchestra. Watanabe joined Toshiko Akiyoshi's Cozy Quartet and began leading the group when Akiyoshi moved to the USA. By 1958, Watanabe had performed with leading musicians and quartets. In 1961, his first album as a leader, the self-titled Sadao Watanabe, was released.

In 1962, he left Japan to study at Berklee College of Music in Boston. Studying led Watanabe to a broadened stylistic scope that began to incorporate Brazilian music. During his time in the USA, he worked with Gary McFarland, Chico Hamilton, and Gábor Szabó.

Watanabe returned to Tokyo in 1965. There, he became the director of the new Yamaha Institute of Popular Music, a school that based its curriculum on Berklee's. From 1966 onwards, he toured Japan and internationally with his own quartet, playing bop, Brazilian music, jazz-rock, soul, and pop music. He played with the John Coltrane quintet in Tokyo while the group was touring Japan in 1966. By the time Watanabe played at the 1970 Newport Jazz Festival, he was a well-known and often highly-regarded jazz performer.

In 1969, Watanabe began working part time as a radio broadcaster, promoting jazz across Japan. From 1972, his programme My Dear Life ran for 20 years. He continued to perform internationally, including performances at Montreux Jazz Festival and Newport Jazz Festival. In 1970, he released his album Round Trip, featuring Chick Corea, Jack DeJohnette, and Miroslav Vitouš. Watanabe continued performing and recording throughout the 1970s and 1980s, amassing a catalogue of more than 70 albums as leader.

In addition to his musical career, Watanabe has published six photography books in Japan.

Watanabe has been in charge of the visiting professor of Jazz course at Kunitachi College of Music since 2010.

== Honors ==
Among Watanabe's awards are the Order of the Rising Sun, the imperial medal of honor for contribution to the arts, and the Fumio Nanri award.

- 1995: Berklee College of Music awarded him an honorary doctorate degree for his contributions to music.
- 2005: Order of the Rising Sun, Gold Rays with Rosette (勲四等旭日小綬章)
- 2015: Order of Rio Branco
- 2026: Person of Cultural Merit

== Discography ==
=== As leader/co-leader ===
Year recorded	Title	Label	Year released	Notes
1961	Sadao Watanabe	King	1961	with Akira Nakano, Kazuo Yashiro, Masanaga Harada, Takeshi Inomata, Akihiro Hasegawa
1962	Cocktails for Two	Toshiba	1962	with Kazuo Yashiro & His Trio, Toshiyuki Miyama & His New Herd
1965	Plays	Polydor	1965	with Akira Miyazawa, Akira Nakano, Norio Maeda, Kazuo Yashiro, Masahiko Togashi, Masanaga Harada
1966	Goin' Home - Modern Jazz Album	Denon	1966	with Toshiyuki Miyama & His New Herd (excp. 3, 7) Kazuo Yashiro & His Trio (3, 7)
1966	Jazz & Bossa	Takt	1967	with Masabumi Kikuchi, Eijiro Hagiwara, Masahiko Togashi, Sadanori Nakamure, Hideo Miyata
1967	Bossa Nova '67	Victor	1967	with Masabumi Kikuchi, Isao Suzuki, Masahiko Togashi, Sadanori Nakamure, Hideo Miyata with strings
1967	My Romance - Sadao Plays Ballads	Takt	1967	with Masabumi Kikuchi, Masanaga Harada, Masahiko Togashi with strings
1967	Encore!! Jazz & Bossa - Sadao Meets Sharps & Flats	Takt	1968	with Nobuo Hara & Sharps and Flats
1967	Jazz Samba	Nivico	1967	with Masabumi Kikuchi, Masanaga Harada, Masahiko Togashi
1967	Bossa Beat Collection	Union	1967	Live with Masabumi Kikuchi, Masanaga Harada, Masahiko Togashi, Sadanori Nakamure, Hideo Miyata
1967	The Girl From Ipanema	RCA	1974	Live with Masabumi Kikuchi, Masanaga Harada, Masahiko Togashi, Sadanori Nakamure, Hideo Miyata
1967	Charlie Mariano & Sadao Watanabe	Victor	1967	with Charlie Mariano, Masabumi Kikuchi, Masanaga Harada, Masahiko Togashi
1967	Iberian Waltz	Takt	1967	with Charlie Mariano, Masabumi Kikuchi, Masanaga Harada, Masahiko Togashi, Fumio Watanabe
1967	Bossa Nova Concert	Takt	1967	Live with Masabumi Kikuchi, Masanaga Harada, Masahiko Togashi, Sadanori Nakamure, Hideo Miyata and Strings Orchestra
1967	Music Break	Takt	1969	Live with Masabumi Kikuchi, Masanaga Harada, Masahiko Togashi, Sadanori Nakamure, Hideo Miyata and Strings Orchestra
1968	We Got a New Bag	Takt	1968	with Charlie Mariano, Masabumi Kikuchi, Masanaga Harada, Fumio Watanabe, Yoshiaki Masuo, Tadashi Shigami, others
1968	Sadao Meets Brazilian Friends	Takt	1968	with Brazilian 8: Jose Ferreira(as), Godinho Filho(as), Carlos Alberto Alcantara(ts), Waldir De Barros(tp), Aparecido Bianchi(org, p), Joao Carlos Pegorro(vib, p), Olmir Seocaer(g), Douglas De oliveira(ds), Mathias Da Silva Matos(b)
1968	Sadao Plays Beatles and Bacharach	Takt	1969	with Tetsuo Fushimi, Terumasa Hino, Yoshiaki Masuo, Fumio Watanabe, Yoshio Ikeda, Hiroshi Suzuki, Nao Imai, Yasushi Ichiura, Yoshio Suzuki, Yuji Imamura, Tomoaki Hashizume, Isao Etoh, Kazuo Yashiro
1969	Swing Journal Jazz Workshop 2 - Dedicated To Charlie Parker	Takt	1969	Live with Terumasa Hino, Masanaga Harada, Fumio Watanabe, Kazuo Yashiro
1969	Pastoral	CBS/Sony	1969	with Kazuo Yashiro, Yoshiaki Masuo, Hiroshi Matsumoto, Yoshio Suzuki, Fumio Watanabe, Syota Tanaka, Chiyoshige Matsubara
1969	Songbook	CBS/Sony	1970	with Yoshiaki Masuo, Yoshio Suzuki, Fumio Watanabe, Kazuo Yashiro, Masabumi Kikuchi
1969	Live at the Junk	CBS/Sony	1970	Live with Yoshiaki Masuo, Yoshio Suzuki, Fumio Watanabe
1970	Sadao Watanabe at Montreux Jazz Festival	CBS/Sony	1971	Quartet (Yoshiaki Masuo, Yoshio Suzuki, Hiro Tsunoda) Live
1970	Round Trip	CBS/Sony	1970	with Jack DeJohnette, Miroslav Vitouš, Chick Corea
1970	Around The Time	WAM	1972	Quartet (Yoshiaki Masuo, Yoshio Suzuki, Hiro Tsunoda)
1970	Collaboration	Philips (Japan)	1971	[2LP] Masabumi Kikuchi Sextet (Kosuke Mine, Masahiro Kikuchi, Yoshio Ikeda, Hiroshi Murakami, Keiji Kishida) with Sadao Watanabe Quartet (Yoshiaki Masuo, Yoshio Suzuki, Hiro Tsunoda)
1971	Paysages	CBS/Sony	1971	with Masabumi Kikuchi, Gary Peacock, Masahiko Togashi, Hiroshi Murakami
1972	Sadao Watanabe	CBS/Sony	1972	Live with Hiroshi Fukumura, Fumio Itabashi, Masayuki Takayanagi, Mitsuaki Furuno, Arihide Kurata
1973	Open Road	CBS/Sony	1973	[2LP] Live with Shunzo Ohno, Hiroshi Fukumura, Kosuke Mine, Takehiro Honda, Yoshio Suzuki, Fumio Watanabe, Yuji Imamura, and strings
1973	Kenya Ya Africa	CBS/Sony	1973	Live with Takehiro Honda, Yoshio Suzuki, Fumio Watanabe, and Inter-African Theatre Group
1974	Mbali Africa	CBS/Sony	1974	Live with Terumasa Hino, Hideo Miyata, Takehiro Honda, Kazumi Watanabe, Isao Suzuki, Fumio Watanabe, Akira Okazawa, Motohiko Hino, Masahiko Togashi
1974	At Pit Inn	CBS/Sony	1975	Live with Cedar Walton, Sam Jones, Billy Higgins
1975	Swiss Air	CBS/Sony	1975	Live with Takehiro Honda, Osamu Kawakami, Shinji Mori
1975	Pamoja	East Wind	1976	Live with Hiroshi Fukumura, Yoshiaki Masuo, Takehiro Honda, Isao Suzuki, Hiroshi Murakami, Masahiko Togashi
1976	I'm Old Fashioned	East Wind	1976	with the Great Jazz Trio: Hank Jones, Ron Carter, Tony Williams
1976	Recital	East Wind	1977	Live with Kosuke Mine, Hiroshi Fukumura, Takehiro Honda, Kazumi Watanabe, Tsutomu Okada, Shinji Mori, Masahiko Togashi, Akira Okazawa
1977	My Dear Life	Flying Disk	1977	with Harvey Mason, Chuck Rainey, Lee Ritenour, Dave Grusin, Steve Forman, Hiroshi Fukumura
1977	Autumn Blow	Flying Disk	1977	Live with Lee Ritenour, Harvey Mason, Anthony Jackson, Patrice Rushen, Ernie Watts
1977	California Shower	Flying Disk	1978	with Harvey Mason, Chuck Rainey, Lee Ritenour, Ernie Watts
1977	Bird of Paradise (Sadao Watanabe album)	Flying Disk	1979	with the Great Jazz Trio: Hank Jones, Ron Carter and Tony Williams
1977	Live In Nemuro 1977	Victor	2016	Live with Hiroshi Fukumura, Takehiro Honda, Tsutomu Okada, Shinji Mori
1978	Carnaval	Galaxy	1983	with the Great Jazz Trio: Hank Jones, Ron Carter and Tony Williams
1979	Morning Island	Flying Disk	1979	with Michael Brecker, Steve Gadd
1980	How's Everything	Columbia	1980	Live with Dave Grusin, Steve Gadd, Richard Tee, Eric Gale, Anthony Jackson, Jon Faddis
1981	Orange Express	CBS/Sony	1981	with Dave Grusin, George Benson, Bobby Broom, Marcus Miller, Buddy Williams
1983	Fill Up the Night	Elektra	1983	with Ralph MacDonald, Richard Tee, Marcus Miller, Steve Gadd, Eric Gale, Paul Griffin, Jorge Dalto, Grady Tate
1984	Rendezvous	Elektra	1984	with Steve Gadd, Eric Gale, Marcus Miller, Richard Tee
1985	Maisha	Elektra	1985	with Don Grusin, Herbie Hancock, Nathan East, Harvey Mason
1985	Parker's Mood - Sadao Watanabe Live at Bravas Club '85	Elektra	1985	Live with Seigen Ono(remix), James Williams, Jeff "Tain" Watts, Charnett Moffett
1985	Tokyo Dating	Elektra	1985	with James Williams(p), Charnett Moffett(b), Jeff "Tain" Watts(ds)
1986	Good Time for Love	Elektra	1986	with Soichi Noriki, Hideo Yamaki, Will Lee and others
1987	Birds of Passage	Elektra	1987	with Russell Ferrante, George Duke, Abraham Laboriel, Carlos Vega, Paul Jackson Jr., John Robinson, Alex Acuña, Diana Acuna, and others
1988	Elis	Elektra	1988	with Cesar Camargo Mariano(key), Heitor Teixeira Perira(g), Papeti(per), Toquinho(g,vo), and others
1988	Made in Coracao Toquinho	Elektra	1988	with Toquinho(g,vo), Ivani Sabino(el-b), Papeti(per), and others
1989	Front Seat	Elektra	1989	with Patti Austin with Russell Ferrante, Jeff Porcaro, George Duke, Jimmy Haslip
1991	Sweet Deal	Elektra	1991	with Don Grusin, Peter Erskine, Russell Ferrante, Abraham Laboriel
1992	A Night with Strings	Elektra	1993	Live with Souichi Noriki, Marc Johnson, Peter Erskine, and The Tokyo Symphony Strings
1993	Earth Step	Verve Forecast	1993	with Rob Mounsey(key), Jeff Mironov(g), Will Lee(b), Steve Gadd
1993	A Night with Strings Vol. 2	Fun House	1994	with Souichi Noriki, Ricardo Silveira(g), Brian Bromberg(b), Alex Acuña(ds), Paulinho Da Costa(per), Vince Mendoza(conduct,arr), and Tokyo Symphony Strings
1994	in Tempo	Verve Forecast	1994	with Cesar Camargo Mariano(key), Marcelo Mariano(el-b), Pantico Rocha(ds), Paulinho Da Costa(per), Leila Pinheiro(vo), Wilson De Castro(vo), and others
1994	A Night with Strings Vol. 3 – Sadao Plays Parker	Fun House	1995	with Russell Ferrante, Marc Johnson, Peter Erskine, and Tokyo Symphony Strings
1997	Go Straight Ahead 'n Make a Left	Verve	1997	with Bernard Wright, Stephen Teele(b), Mike Flythe(ds), Hassan Flythe(ds), Steve Thornton(per), Charley Drayton(ds)
1995–97	Kuroi Hitomi - Sadao Watanabe Song Book	Verve	1997	with Akira Onozuka(p,key), Jun Kajiwara(g), Tomohito Aoki(b), Kouichi Osamu(b), Masaharu Ishikawa(ds), Olodum Juvenil(per), Junior High School Students in Tochigi(cho), Cesar Camargo Mariano(key), Leila Pinheiro(vo), Vaneese Thomas(vo), and others
1998	Viajando	Verve	1998	with Cesar Camargo Mariano(key), Romero Lubambo(g), Nilson Matta(b), Paulo Braga(ds), Cafe(per), PamelaDriggs(vo)
1999	Remembrance	Verve	1999	with Cyrus Chestnut, Christian McBride, Billy Drummond, Nicholas Payton, Robin Eubanks, Romero Lubambo
2000	Sadao 2000	Verve	2000	with Richard Bona(b,g,per,vo), George Whitty(p,key), Jonathan Joseph(ds), Mike Stern(g), Cafe(per)
2000	Minha Saudade	Universal Music	2001	Live with Cesar Camargo Mariano(p), Romero Lubambo(ac-g), David Finck(b), Paulo Braga(ds), Mauro Refosco(per), and Tokyo Symphony Chamber Orchestra
2003	Wheel of Life	Verve	2003	with Richard Bona(el-b, el-g, per, vo), George Whitty(pf,key), Nathaniel Townsley(ds), Mike Stern(el-g), Romero Lubambo(ac-g)
2005	One for You	Victor	2006	Live with Richard Bona(elb,vo), Etienne Stadwijk(pf,key), Nathaniel Townsley(ds), N'Diassé Niang(per)
2005	Sadao & Charlie Again	Victor	2006	Live with Charlie Mariano(as), Bob Degen(p), Dieter Ilg(b), Bill Elgart(dr)
2007	Basie's at Night	Koch	2008	Live with Akira Onozuka, Kouichi Osamu, Masaharu Ishikawa, N'Diassé Niang
2009?	Into Tomorrow	Victor	2009	with Gerald Clayton(p), Ben Williams(b), Johnathan Blake(ds)
2011	Come Today	Victor	2013	with Gerald Clayton(p), Ben Williams(b), Johnathan Blake(ds)
2013?	Outra Vez	Victor	2013	with Fabio Torres(p), Swami Jr.(g), Paulo Paulelli(b), Celso de Almeida(ds), Cleber Almeida(per), Fabiana Cozza(vo)
2014	I'm with You	Victor	2015	with Russell Ferrante, Peter Erskine
2015?	Naturally	Victor	2015	with Lula Galvão(g), Itamar Assiere(p), Alberto Continentino(b), Paulo Braga(ds), Sidinho Moreira(per), Jaques Morelenbaum(cello)
2016	Encore!	Victor	2017	Live with Dave Grusin, Russell Ferrante, Robben Ford
2016	Re-Bop	Victor	2017	with Cyrus Chestnut, Chris Thomas, Brian Blade
2018?	Re-Bop the Night	Victor	2018	with Russell Ferrante, Ben Williams, Kendrick Scott
2019	Sadao 2019 - Live at Blue Note Tokyo	Victor	2019	Live with Russell Ferrante, John Patitucci, Steve Gadd
2021	Jazz & Bossa Live at Suntory Hall	Victor	2021	Live with Masaki Hayashi(p), como kiichiro komobuchi(b), Ittetsu Takemura(ds), Marcelo Kimura(g), Takayuki Oshikane Strings
2024	Peace	M&M Music Inc.	2024	with Russell Ferrante, Ben Williams, Kazunori Takemura

=== As sideman ===
With Ithamara Koorax

- Red River (Paddle Wheel, 1995)
- Rio Vermelho (Imagem, 1995)
- The Luiz Bonfa Songbook (Huks, 2002)

With Masabumi Kikuchi

- Collaboration (Philips, 1970)
- All About Dancing Mist (Philips, 1971)

With Masahiko Togashi

- Song for Myself (East Wind, 1974)
- Spiritual Nature (East Wind, 1975)

With others

- Toshiko Akiyoshi, Toshiko Meets Her Old Pals (King, 1961)
- Randy Brecker and Eliane Elias, Amanda (Passport, 1985)
- Randy Crawford, Through the Eyes of Love (Warner Bros., 1992)
- Hiroshi Fukumura, Hunt Up Wind (Flying Disk, 1978)
- Dave Grusin, Live in Japan (JVC, 1980) – live
- Don Grusin, The Hang (C.A.R.E., 2004)
- Chico Hamilton, El Chico (Impulse!, 1965)
- Terumasa Hino, Live in Concert (East Wind, 1975) – live
- Akira Miyazawa, Yamame (King, 1977)
- Armando Manzanero, El Piano (BMG/RCA, 1995)
- Cesar Camargo Mariano, Mitos (CBS, 1988)
- Gary McFarland, The In Sound (Verve, 1966)
- Armando Peraza, Wild Thing (Skye, 1969)
- Greg Phillinganes, Significant Gains (Planet, 1981)
- Santana, At Budokan (Masterplan, 2007)
- Isao Suzuki, My Spare Time (Flying Disk, 1978)
- Gabor Szabo, Gypsy '66 (Impulse!, 1966)
- Toquinho, Vamos Juntos Toquinho Live at Bravas Club '86 (Polydor, 1986) – live
- Super Mario World Arranged OST, Warner-Pioneer, 1991

=== Compilation albums ===
- Selected (Elektra, 1988)
- Sadao Watanabe Vocal Collection (Elektra, 1991)
- Sadao Watanabe My Dear Life 50th Anniversary Collection (Verve, 2001)
- Sketches of Nature (Verve, 2005)
- Broadcast Tracks '69–'72 (Victor, 2005)
- Love Songs (Victor, 2018)
