= Black Is the Color (album) =

Studio album by Joe Henderson
- Released: End of August/early September 1972
- Recorded: March or April 1972; Mercury Sound Studios, New York
- Genre: Jazz-funk
- Length: 36:37
- Label: Milestone; MSP 9040
- Producer: Orrin Keepnews

Joe Henderson chronology
Joe Henderson in Japan (1971)	Black Is the Color (1972)	Multiple (1973)

Black Is the Color is an album by the American saxophonist Joe Henderson, released in 1972 on Milestone. The original idea for the album was "to approach it entirely from the standpoint of having no pre-conceived ideas (i.e., melodies, themes, bar lines, etc.) for the musicians to relate to." However, after listening to a tape copy of one segment of the original session, the saxophonist, "became aware of further possibilities. Making full use of 16-track tape, we could add to and improve upon what had already been recorded by multiple overdubbing of new parts, by myself and others, that would become permanent additions to the track." The players include keyboardist George Cables, bassists Dave Holland and Ron Carter, drummer Jack DeJohnette and percussionist Airto.

Professional ratings
Review scores
Source	Rating
All About Jazz	(mixed)
AllMusic	2/5 stars
The Rolling Stone Jazz Record Guide	2/5 stars

== Track listing ==
All pieces by Joe Henderson.

1. "Terra Firma" – 12:12
2. "Vis-a-Vis" – 6:49
3. "Foregone Conclusion" – 4:57
4. "Black Is the Color (Of My True Love's Mind)" – 7:03
5. "Current Events" – 5:36

== Personnel ==
- Joe Henderson – tenor saxophone, soprano saxophone (3, 4), percussion (1, 3), flute (1, 4), alto flute (1, 3, 4)
- George Cables – piano (4), electric piano (1–3, 5)
- David Horowitz – synthesizer (1, 3, 5)
- Georg Wadenius – guitar (1, 2, 4, 5)
- Dave Holland – bass
- Ron Carter – electric bass (1, 5)
- Jack DeJohnette – electric piano (4), drums
- Airto Moreira – congas (3), percussion (3, 4)
- Ralph MacDonald – congas (1), percussion (1, 4)
