= Hiroshi Murakami =

Japanese jazz drummer (born 1948)

Hiroshi Murakami (村上 寛, Murakami Hiroshi, born March 14, 1948, Tokyo) is a Japanese jazz drummer.

Murakami began playing percussion as a teenager, and was playing in a group with Takehiro Honda at age 19. He would go on to play with Masabumi Kikuchi, Kosuke Mine, and Sadao Watanabe in the 1970s, in addition to drumming for the group Native Son. In 1981 he started working as a leader, and has continued playing as a sideman for, among others, Nobuyoshi Ino, Manabu Oishi, and Hidefumi Toki.
