= Live at Birdland (Toshiko – Mariano Quartet) =

Live album by Toshiko Akiyoshi, Charlie Mariano
- Released: 1991
- Recorded: 2 April 1960, 7 October 1961
- Venue: Birdland Club, New York City
- Genre: Jazz
- Length: 53:49
- Label: Fresh Sound Records

Toshiko Akiyoshi chronology
Toshiko Meets Her Old Pals (1961)	Live at Birdland (1961)	Toshiko - Mariano Quartet (in West Side) (1963)

Charlie Mariano chronology
The Toshiko – Mariano Quartet (1961)	Live at Birdland (1963)	Toshiko – Mariano Quartet (in West Side) (1963)

Alternative cover
- 2011 Studio Songs re-issue

Professional ratings
Review scores
Source	Rating
The Penguin Guide to Jazz Recordings	3/4 stars

Live at Birdand by the Toshiko - Mariano Quartet is a jazz album made from recordings taken at the Birdland Club in New York City on two separate occasions in 1960 and 1961. It was released on CD in 1991 by the European Fresh Sound label.

== Track listing ==
1. "Deep River" (traditional) – 4:44
2. "Song of the Farm" (Akiyoshi) – 6:00
3. "Blues for Father" (Akiyoshi, Mariano) – 8:30
4. "When You Meet Her" (Mariano) – 5:54
5. "Elegy" (Akiyoshi) – 9:57
6. "When Johnny Comes Marching Home" (traditional) – 7:41
7. "Tempus Fugit" (Powell) – 5:32
8. "Blues for Father" (Akiyoshi, Mariano) – 5:31

== Personnel ==
- Toshiko Akiyoshi – piano
- Charlie Mariano – alto saxophone
- Eddie Marshall – drums
- Gene Cherico – bass

== References / External Links ==
- Allmusic
- Fresh Sound Records FSCD-1021 (1991)
- Studio Songs YZSO-10018 (2011)
