= Akira Miyazawa =

Akira Miyazawa (宮沢昭) (December 6, 1927 in Matsumoto – July 6, 2000 in Tokyo) was a Japanese jazz saxophonist, clarinetist, and flautist.

Miyazawa played as a teenager in Japanese military bands during World War II, then embarked on a career in jazz music after the war. He worked extensively with Toshiko Akiyoshi in the 1950s and 1960s, as well as with Yasuo Arakawa, Hampton Hawes, Hidehiko Matsumoto, Helen Merrill, Shotaro Moriyasu, Masahiko Satoh, Masahiko Togashi, Mal Waldron, and Sadao Watanabe.

Miyazawa left jazz in the 1970s but returned in 1981 with the albums My Piccolo and On Green Dolphin Street.
