= Shungo Sawada =

Japanese Jazz Guitarist

Shungo Sawada (born Tokyo, February 10, 1930 - died August 28, 2006) was a Japanese jazz guitarist.

Sawada began playing guitar at twelve years old, and played in his early twenties on US military installations. He founded his own group, Double Beats, in 1954, and led a five-piece band in the mid-1960s. His Japanese sidemen included Shotaro Moriyasu, Norio Maeda, Akitoshi Igarashi, and Motohiko Hino; he also played with visiting American musicians such as Stan Getz, Dizzy Gillespie, Benny Goodman, Thad Jones, Helen Merrill, Oscar Peterson, and Sonny Stitt. He was the founder of the label Elec in 1972, and later taught at Roots College of Music in Tokyo.

== Discography ==
- Top Stars in Guitar (Toshiba, 1967)
- Go Go Scat (King, 1968)
- Fool on the Hill (Victor, 1969)
- Formation (Victor, 1970)
- Super Guitar 4 Vol. 1 Live at the Grand Hotel Hamamatsu (1974)
- Guitar Bossa with Sadanori Nakamure (RCA, 1977)
- Mas Que Nada (RCA, 1978)
- Shiroi Cho No Samba / Guitar In Blue Night (Royal Records, circa 1970)
