= Hidehiko Matsumoto =

Hidehiko "Sleepy" Matsumoto (松本英彦) (October 12, 1926, Okayama Prefecture – February 29, 2000, Tokyo) was a Japanese jazz saxophonist and bandleader.

Born in Okayama Prefecture and raised in Fuchū, Hiroshima, Matsumoto played bebop in Japan in the late 1940s with the group CB Nine, then joined The Six Josés and The Big Four, a group which included George Kawaguchi, Hachidai Nakamura, and Mitsuru Ono. In 1959 he became a member of Hideo Shiraki's small ensemble, and played with Gerald Wilson at the 1963 Monterey Jazz Festival and Toshiko Akiyoshi in 1964. Starting in 1964 he led his own ensembles, which have included as sidemen Takeshi Inomata, Akira Miyazawa, George Otsuka, and Isao Suzuki. On July 22 and 24, 1966, he played with the John Coltrane quintet in Tokyo while the group was touring Japan. In 1979, Los Angeles Times jazz critic Conrad Silvert heard Matsumoto play at Tokyo's Birdland club with actor Takuya Fujioka on vocals.
