= Wolfgang Köhler (pianist) =

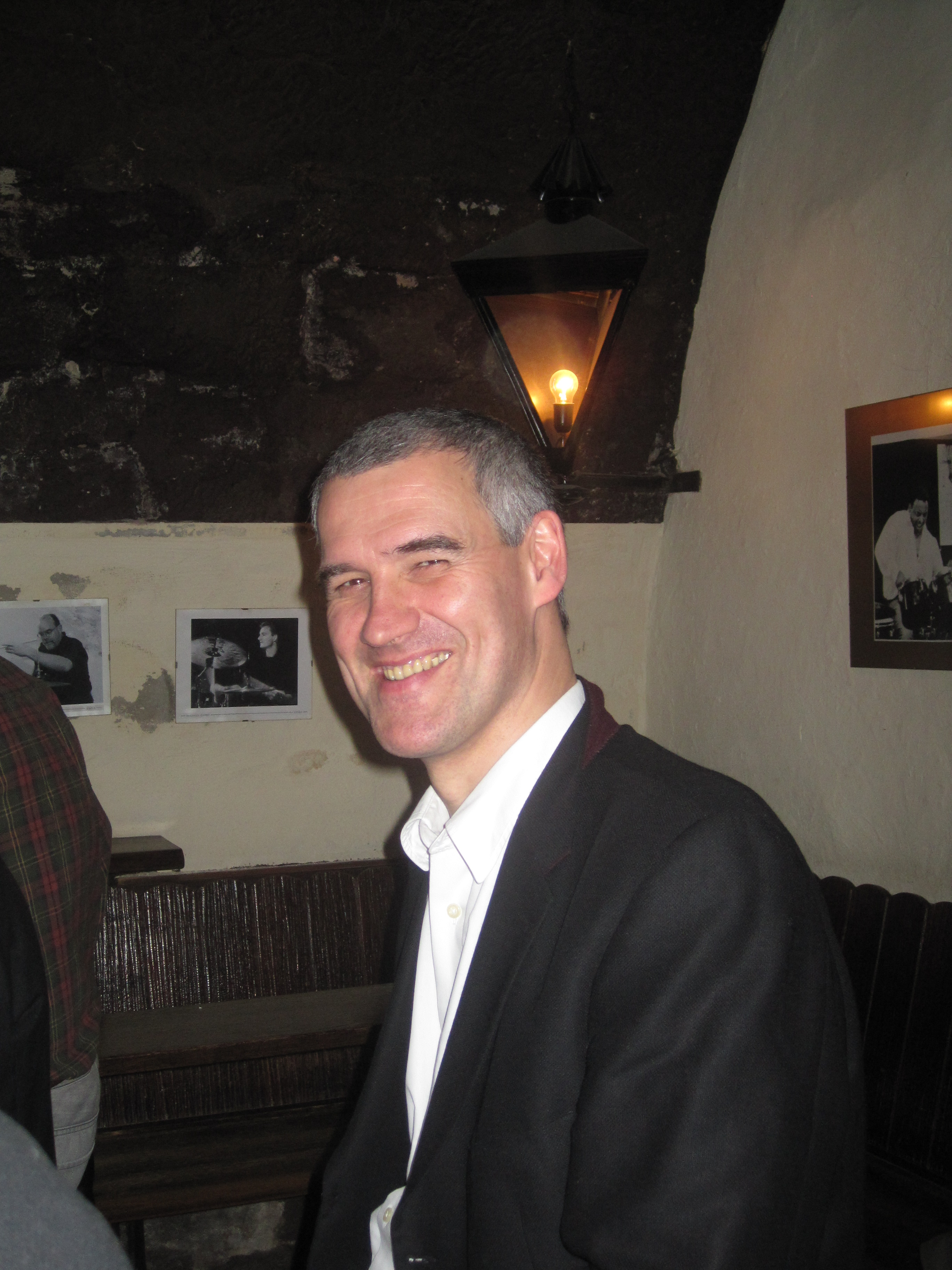

Background information
- Born: October 15, 1960 (age 65); Hofgeismar, Hesse; Germany
- Genres: Jazz
- Occupation: Musician
- Instrument: Piano

Wolfgang Köhler (October 15, 1960 in Hofgeismar) is a German professor of jazz and a jazz pianist.

== Works and activities ==
As a pianist in the group "Just Friends", he made several tours in the German speaking countries from 1978 to 1991. In 1980, he started to study under Walter Norris and others at Berlin University of the Arts.

Since then, he played with numerous well-known artists like Jiggs Whigham, Randy Brecker, Herb Geller, Benny Bailey, Gitte Hænning, Nigel Kennedy, John Marshall and Ack van Rooyen. From 1982 to 1986, he was a member of RIAS Dance Orchestra and later also a pianist in some of talk shows.

Wolfgang Köhler has composed two revues in collaboration with the playwright Gerhard Haase-Hindenberg. He has composed also several film music including for the children's television series Karfunkel in ZDF.

Since 1999, he has been a professor at the Hochschule für Musik "Hanns Eisler" in Berlin. He has played with Tahsin İncirci since 2005. He has also performed as a member of Duo Divan. Since 2000, he has been the bandleader of Allan Praskin Wolfgang Köhler quartet.
