= Naniwa Express =

Japanese jazz fusion band

Naniwa Express (ナニワエキスプレス, also written as 浪花エキスプレス) was a Japanese jazz fusion group active from 1977 to 1986. According to The New Grove Dictionary of Jazz it was "one of the most successful jazz fusion bands in Japan". The group was founded by Ko Shimizu and Kazuhiko Iwami, with Kiyoshi Kamada on drums in the early years; Kenji Nakamura joined in 1978. The group traveled to the US in 1979 and returned in 1980; Rikiya Higashihara and Makoto Aoyagi joined in 1981. The group made its first recordings for CBS/Sony in 1982, and continued recording until its dissolution in 1986. Limited reunion touring and recording occurred in the 2000s as well as multiple gigs in the 2010s and 2020s.

== Members ==
- Kazuhiko Iwami - guitar
- Kenji Nakamura - keyboards
- Ko Shimizu (ja) - bass
- Makoto Aoyagi (ja) - piano, saxophone
- Rikiya Higashihara - drums

== Discography ==
- No Fuse (CBS/Sony, 1982)
- Daiuchuhmugenryokushin (CBS/Sony, 1982)
- Wind Up (CBS/Sony, 1983)
- Modern Beat (CBS/Sony, 1984)
- Silent Savanna (CBS/Sony, 1985)
- life of music (Wave Flower, 2003)
- THIS is IT! (Wave Flower, 2004)
- Fresh Dude (Danger Crue, 2012)

=== Other releases ===
- Live at Nagoya Fukiage hall (video) (Sony, 1984)
- Scarlet Beam (compilation) (CBS/Sony, 1985)
- Believin' (single) (CBS/Sony, 1986)
- Red Zone SBM Best Selection (compilation) (Sony, 1993)
- Naniwa Express Box (compilation) (SMDR GT Music, 2007)
