= Kosuke Mine =

Japanese jazz saxophonist (born 1944)

Kosuke Mine (峰厚介) (born Kenji Wakabayashi, February 6, 1944, Tokyo) is a Japanese jazz saxophonist.

Mine played clarinet as a youth before switching to saxophone as a teenager. He began recording as a leader around 1970, and worked during this time with Masabumi Kikuchi, Joe Henderson, and Mal Waldron. He moved to New York City in 1973, but came back to Japan in 1975, and subsequently became a member of the fusion group Native Son. He has also worked with Nobuyoshi Ino, Sadao Watanabe, and Terumasa Hino.

== Discography ==
- First (Philips, 1970)
- Mine (Three Blind Mice, 1970)
- 2nd Album (Three Blind Mice, 1971)
- Yellow Carcass in the Blue with Kimiko Kasai (Three Blind Mice, 1971)
- Daguri (JVC Victor, 1973)
- Out of Chaos (East Wind, 1974)
- Sunshower (East Wind, 1976)
- Solid (East Wind, 1976)
- Major to Minor (Verve, 1993)
- Bamboo Grove (Days of Delight, 2019)
