= Shōtarō Moriyasu =

Japanese pianist

Shōtarō Moriyasu (守安 祥太郎, Moriyasu Shōtarō; January 5, 1924 – September 25, 1955) was a Japanese jazz pianist. He became a leading bebop musician in Japan in the early to mid-1950s, but was never officially recorded. His suicide at the age of 31 contributed to his image as a tragic artistic figure in jazz.

== Early life ==
Moriyasu was born in Tokyo. He was self-taught on piano, though his parents were musically inclined. He graduated from Keio University.

== Later life and career ==
Moriyasu sold refrigerators for a short time, then became a professional musician in the late 1940s, when there was an increase in entertainment opportunities in Japan. He worked in the bands of Shungo Sawada and Nobuo Hara, also arranging for Hara's ensemble, Sharps and Flats.

Moriyasu's first pianistic influence was Teddy Wilson, but he turned to studying the bebop of Bud Powell around 1950, "transcribing not only melodies but solos, bass lines, drum fills, and harmonic progressions". At this time, Moriyasu was playing with the Red Hot Boys at the 400 Club in Yokohama. He also attended jam sessions in the same city that included musicians who were part of the American military involved in the occupation of Japan. His association with like-minded tenor saxophonist Akira Miyazawa in the Four Sounds was short but inspiring.

"Before long he was regarded as the most accomplished bopper in Japan, whose awesome technique and odd personal habits intimidated many musicians and audiences." Moriyasu was an exception to the tendency of the time for soloists in jazz in Japan to play whatever most pleased the audience, which was made up of both American occupiers and locals. "The word 'apparition' (maboroshi) has become irrevocably associated with him. His pale, sickly countenance suggested a salaried office worker rather than the hippest pianist in Japan." Moriyasu occasionally played while "sitting beneath the keyboard with his back to the instrument, essentially playing the piano backwards." He had large hands, stretching to play tenths with ease.

Moriyasu was never officially recorded; the only recording that exists was made during an all-night session at the Mocambo club in Yokohama on July 27–28, 1954. These were first released, on LP, 22 years later.

"In the last months of his life Moriyasu started exhibiting strange and unstable behavior." On September 28, 1955, Moriyasu killed himself at the age of 31 by jumping into the path of a moving train in Tokyo.

== Legacy ==
E. Taylor Atkins wrote of Moriyasu's legacy:

Moriyasu's significance extends beyond his considerable prowess as a player, for by taking his own life in a fit of artistic and personal frustration, he provided Japan with a tragic and mythic figure, something which all jazz cultures create. He was the 'Japanese version' of the tortured creative genius whose single-minded devotion to his own art inhibited his ability to make it beyond the 'dues-paying' stage.
