= Norio Maeda =

Japanese jazz composer and pianist

- Born: December 6, 1934
- Died: November 25, 2018 (aged 83)
- Era: 20th century

Norio Nobuhito Maeda (前田 憲男, Maeda Norio; December 6, 1934 – November 25, 2018 Osaka Prefecture) was a Japanese jazz composer and pianist.

Maeda learned piano as a young child, and moved to Tokyo to play and arrange jazz professionally in 1955. There he played with Shungo Sawada's ensemble and founded a group called the Wind Breakers. He joined the West Liners, led by Konosuke Saijo, as a pianist and arranger in 1959. Known as a composer, he penned pieces for The Blue Coats, Tatsuya Takahashi, Nobuo Hara, and Toshiyuki Miyama. He also founded We 3 with Yasuo Arakawa and Takeshi Inomata, and later worked with Inomata again in a trio with Sadanori Nakamure.

On 25 November 2018, Maeda died from pneumonia at a hospital in Tokyo.
