= Motohiko Hino =

Japanese jazz drummer

Motohiko "Toko" Hino (January 3, 1946 in Tokyo – May 13, 1999) was a Japanese jazz drummer.

Hino's father, who was a dancer and musician, taught Hino and his brother, Terumasa Hino, tap dancing as children. At the age of ten, Hino began playing drums, and by age 17 was playing professionally.

In the mid-1970s, Hino was repeatedly voted by Swing Journal as the best jazz drummer in Japan, though from 1978 he was based in New York City. He released an album under his own name in 1971 and two more in the early 1990s, and played with musicians such as JoAnne Brackeen, Joe Henderson, Takehiro Honda, Nobuyoshi Ino, Karen Mantler, Hugh Masekela, John Scofield, Jean-Luc Ponty, Sonny Rollins, and Shungo Sawada.

He died in 1999 of cancer.

== Discography ==
- First Album (Columbia, 1971)
- Sailing Ice (TBM, 1976)
- Sailing Stone (Gramavision, 1992)
- It's There (Fun House, 1993)

With Jon Faddis and Billy Harper

- Jon & Billy (Trio, 1974)

With Joe Henderson

- Joe Henderson in Japan (Milestone, 1973)
