= Nobuo Hara =

Japanese jazz saxophonist (1926–2021)

Nobuo Tsukahara, better known as Nobuo Hara (November 19, 1926–June 21, 2021) was a Japanese jazz saxophonist and bandleader.

Hara was born in Toyama. He played in a military band during World War II and in a Tokyo officers' club after the war. He took leadership of the ensemble Sharps and Flats in 1952, which he would lead until the 1980s. This band recorded copiously and appeared at the Newport Jazz Festival. Sharps and Flats accompanied Chiemi Eri and included sidemen such as Masato Honda, Norio Maeda, Shotaro Moriyasu, and Akitoshi Igarashi.

Hara died of pneumonia on June 21, 2021, in Tokyo.

== See also ==
- Red Hot Sun
