= Hideo Shiraki =

Japanese jazz drummer and bandleader

Hideo Shiraki (白木秀雄; 1 January 1933 in Tokyo – 31 August 1972) was a Japanese jazz drummer and bandleader, best known for his work in the 1950s and 1960s. Famed earlier on for hard bop, he later explored world music and became a pioneer of fusing traditional music forms with jazz structuring.

He emerged in the new Japanese jazz scene of the 1950s that grew out of the influence of the US occupying forces. He studied percussion at the Tokyo School of Fine Arts and, during this period, played with Masashi Nagao's Blue Coats.

In the late 1950s and early 1960s, his quintet was popular in Japan and was associated with the "funky boom" craze for hard bop. Hidehiko "Sleepy" Matsumoto, Terumasa Hino and Yuzuru Sera all passed through his quintet.

Notable albums include 1961's In Fiesta (Teichiku Japan), which included a version of Benny Golson's "Five Spot After Dark". Performers on the album included Hidehiko Matsumoto on tenor and flute and Yuzuru Sera on piano.

1965's Sakura Sakura united the quintet (including Terumasa Hino on trumpet) with three female koto players as Shiraki moved into a world jazz approach. An invited November 1965 performance at the Berlin Jazz Festival, organised by Joachim-Ernst Berendt, saw the quintet work with a koto quartet and was feted for mixing jazz with traditional Japanese music.

He also played with Toshiko Akiyoshi, including two tracks on her 1961 album Toshiko Meets Her Old Pals.

On July 22, 1966, he played with the John Coltrane quintet in Tokyo while the group was touring Japan.

== Sources ==
- Jazz.com Encyclopedia of jazz musicians
