= Isao Suzuki =

Japanese jazz bassist (1933–2022)

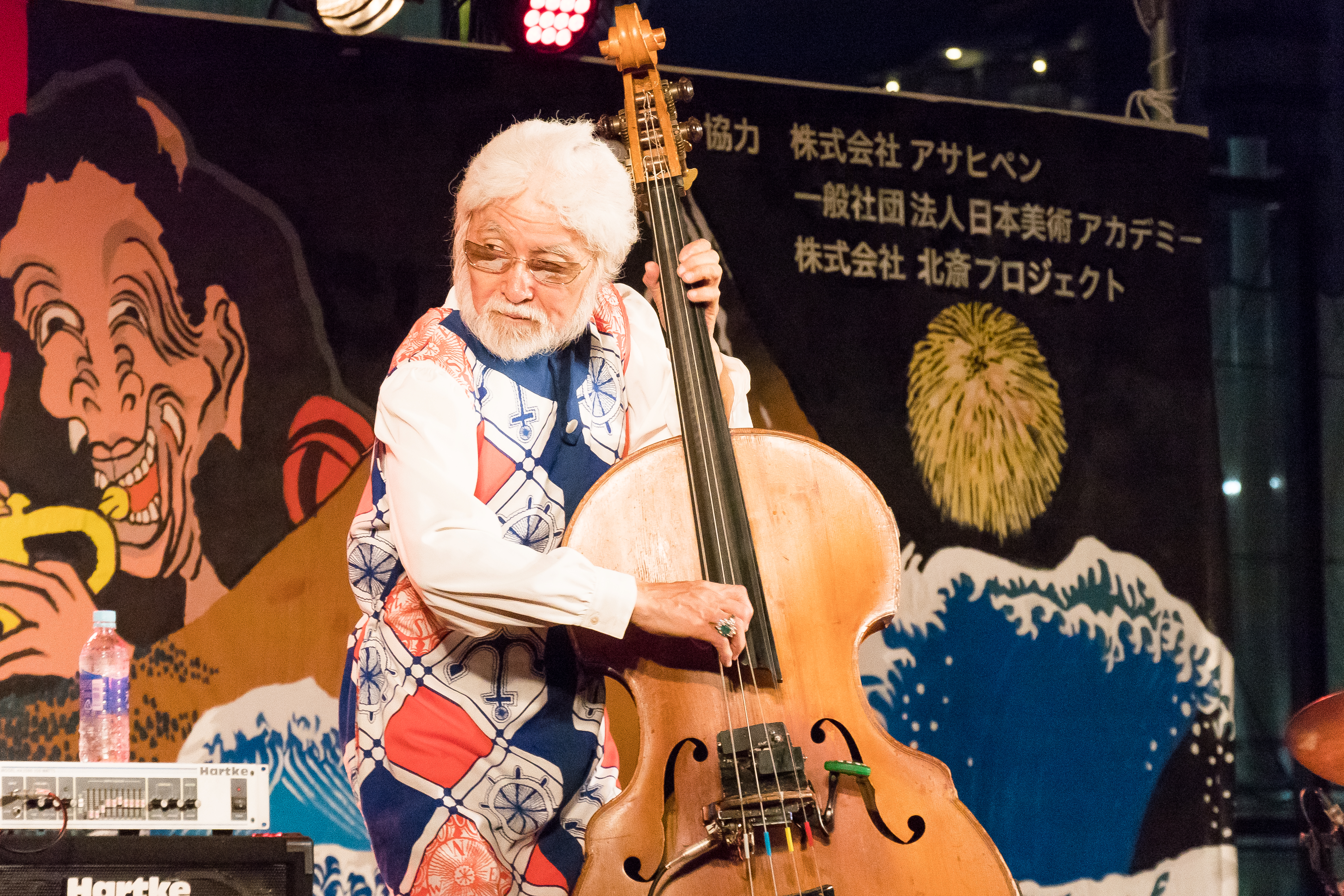
Suzuki in 2019

Hisao Oma "Isao" Suzuki (鈴木 勲, Suzuki Isao; 2 January 1933 – 8 March 2022) was a Japanese jazz double-bassist.

== Biography ==
Born in Tokyo, Japan, Suzuki learned to play bass on United States military bases, and played early in his career with Shotaro Moriyasu, Hidehiko Matsumoto, and Sadao Watanabe. He led his own ensemble in Tokyo from 1965–1969, also performing with Hampton Hawes in 1968. He moved to New York City from 1969 to 1971, playing with Ron Carter, Paul Desmond, Ella Fitzgerald, Jim Hall, Wynton Kelly, Charles Mingus, Thelonious Monk, and Bobby Timmons. Returning to Japan, he played with Kenny Burrell and Mal Waldron in addition to his own ensembles. Later in the 1970s, he began expanding his instrumental repertoire, playing cello and piccolo bass. He was a cofounder of the Japanese Bass Players Club with Hideto Kanai, and opened a jazz club in Osaka in 1987.

Suzuki played wildly, but pensively. He was awarded the Fumio Nanri prize in 2008.

He died from COVID-19 in Kawasaki, Kanagawa, on 8 March 2022, at the age of 89, during the COVID-19 pandemic in Japan.
