= Tatsuya Takahashi (saxophonist) =

Japanese saxophonist (1931-2008)

Tatsuya Takahashi (高橋 達也, Takahashi Tatsuya, December 24, 1931 in Tsuruoka, Yamagata – February 29, 2008 in Tokyo) was a Japanese jazz saxophonist.

Takahashi played on US military bases in the early 1950s, and later in the decade moved to Tokyo. He worked with Keiichiro Ebihara from 1961, and by 1966 was leading his own ensemble, Tokyo Union, which remained active until 1989. In the 1970s he played at the Monterey and Montreux Jazz Festivals. After leaving Tokyo Union, Takahashi worked in jazz education, and in 1996 founded a new ensemble, Jazz Groovys.
