= Toshiyuki Miyama =

Japanese jazz clarinetist and bandleader (1921–2016)

- Born: October 31, 1921; Chiba, Japan
- Died: May 24, 2016 (aged 94)
- Genres: Jazz
- Instruments: Clarinet

Toshiyuki Miyama (October 31, 1921 – May 24, 2016) was a Japanese jazz clarinetist and bandleader.

== Career ==
Miyama played in a Japan Maritime Self-Defense Force band during World War II. After the war, he joined the Lucky Puppy Orchestra. He led his own ensemble from 1950; initially called Jive Ace, the group expanded to big-band size and changed its name to the New Herd in 1958. The ensemble's arranger was Kozaburo Yamaki. New Herd recorded with Charles Mingus in 1971 and toured worldwide throughout the 1970s and 1980s. Miyama led the ensemble for more than fifty years, continuing to perform into the 2000s.
