= Fumio Nanri =

Japanese jazz trumpet player, band master (1910–1975)

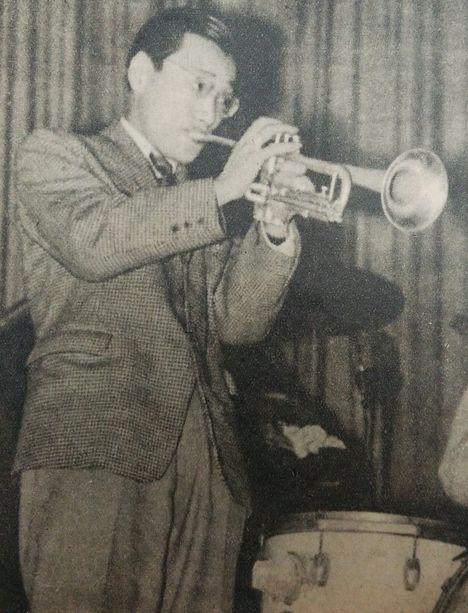
Nanri Fumio

Fumio Nanri (南里 文雄, Nanri Fumio, December 24, 1910 – August 4, 1975) was a Japanese jazz trumpeter nicknamed the "Satchmo of Japan" by Louis Armstrong. He was one of Japan's first jazz musicians to become known outside his native country. A long-standing prestigious music award, "The Fumio Nanri Award", was named after him.

== Life ==
Fumio Nanri was born at Minamikyuhoji-machi, Osaka City, Osaka Prefecture, Japan. He was the youngest child in the six brothers/sisters and his father died four days after his birth. For that reason he often changed his address; Hiroshima Prefecture where his mother's family home were in, Kyoto Prefecture where the family his elder sister married into, Kobe where his elder brother lived in, and various locations. He entered 高島屋少年音楽隊 (Takashimaya Shōnen Ongakutai), the boys' band of Takashimaya, in 1925 after he graduated from a senior high school in Kobe. He played at a dance hall in Kobe after the boys' band disbanded. Then he moved to Tokyo in 1928 and entered Ichiro Ida (井田一郎, Ida Ichirō)'s band (the second term of Cherry Land (チェリーランド, cherīrand)), but mere two months after he ran away from the band.

Nanri moved to Shanghai in 1929, and studied the piano with Teddy Weatherford. He went to San Francisco in 1932, and that year he entered Shigeya Kikuchi (菊地滋弥, Kikuchi Shigeya)'s band which was playing at Florida in Tameike (溜池, Tameike), Akasaka, Tokyo. In 1934 he formed his own band, Fumio Nanri and Hot Peppers, which accompanied singer Dick Mine (ディック・ミネ, Dikku Mine) when Mine recorded.

Nanri lived in Dalian, China from 1937 to 1940, he played at Perroquet Dance Hall (ペロケ舞踏場, Peroke Butō-jō) in 1937. He often came back to Japan and recorded in these years. He was called up and went into the service of Kurume The 48th Military Unit (久留米第48部隊, Kurume Dai Yonjū-Hachi Butai) as a combat medic in February, 1944.

Nanri formed the first term of Hot Peppers in 1946. He then formed the second term of Hot Peppers with Hana Hajime (ハナ肇, Hana Hajime), Toshiyuki Ichimura (市村俊幸, Ichimura Toshiyuki) and some musicians in 1948.

Nanri suffered a sudden onset of optic atrophy in 1953 and nearly lost his sight. He nevertheless came back in August and he played with Louis Armstrong in December in that year when Armstrong came to Japan. Nanri played with Bobby Hackett, Clark Terry and some musicians at Trumpet Workshop to the memory of the late Louis Armstrong in 1971. Nanri always played Dixieland jazz in a straight line, however he was engaged upon bebop for a period of postwar time.

Nanri had the commemorative recital of his jazz life 48th anniversary in 1973. He held a jazz concert to support Vietnamese people in 1974. Nanri died on August 4, 1975, at the age of 64.
