= Takeshi Inomata =

Japanese jazz drummer (1936–2024)

Takeshi Inomata (jap. 猪俣 猛, Inomata Takeshi; February 6, 1936, Takarazuka – October 4, 2024) was a Japanese jazz drummer and bandleader.

Inomata moved to Tokyo in 1956 and there played in the Six Joses and the West Liners. He worked as a leader regularly from the late 1950s. He and Norio Maeda worked together repeatedly, both as part of the We 3 trio (with Yasuo Arakawa) and with other combinations which at times included Tatsuro Takimoto and Sadanori Nakamure. He moved to the United States early in the 1960s, where he studied with Alan Dawson; following his return he founded a jazz education program called Rhythm Clinic Center. In the 1990s, he toured the United States with a group called the Japan Jazz All Stars.

Inomata appeared on over 300 recordings over the course of his career. He died on October 4, 2024, at the age of 88.

== Sources ==
- Kazunori Sugiyama, "Takeshi Inomata". The New Grove Dictionary of Jazz. 2nd edition, ed. Barry Kernfeld.
