= 希望 =

希望 (Onyomi: きぼう kibō; Kunyomi: のぞみ nozomi; Pinyin: xīwàng) is a Japanese and Chinese term meaning "hope". It may refer to:

- Kibo (ISS module)
- Hope (Toshiko Akiyoshi album)
- Hope (Toshiko Akiyoshi song)
- Nozomi Okuhara (奥原 希望, 1995–), Japanese badminton player
- Nozomi Yamamoto (山本 希望, 1988–), Japanese voice actress

== See also ==
- Kibo (disambiguation)
- Nozomi (disambiguation)
