= Non =

Non, non or NON can refer to:

- Non, a negatory word in French, Italian and Latin

== People ==
- Non (given name)
- Non Boonjumnong (born 1982), Thai amateur boxer
- Rena Nōnen (born 1993), Japanese actress who uses the stage name "Non" since July 2016
- Nozomi Ōsaka, Japanese illustrator also known as Non
- NON, a name used by musician Boyd Rice

== Other uses ==
- Abbreviation of NATO's Allied Forces North Norway Command
- Non (album), The Amenta
- Non (book), a 2009 book by Japanese model Nozomi Sasaki
- Non (character), a villain of Superman in the DC Comics universe
- Non! (EP), Big Country
- "Non", a song by Phinehas from the album Till the End
- non, ISO 639-2 and ISO 639-3 language code for Old Norse
- NON Records, an independent record label based in Amsterdam, Netherlands

== See also ==
- nan (disambiguation)
