= Nozomi (given name) =

- Pronunciation: Nozomi
- Gender: Unisex

Origin
- Origin: Japanese
- Meaning: wish望, hope希 although the name can have different meanings depending on the kanji used
- Region of origin: Japan

Nozomi (のぞみ, Nozomi) is a unisex Japanese given name.

== Different ways of writing ==
- 望, "wish"
- 希, "hope"
- のぞみ — hiragana
- ノゾミ — katakana
- 臨, "face, attend, command"
- 望美, "wishful beauty"
- 望海, "wishful ocean"
- 望実, "wishful truth"
- 満, "satisfy, full"
- 希実, "hopeful truth"
- 希美, "hopeful beauty"
- 望魅, "wishful fascination"

== People with the name ==
- Nozomi Bando (坂東 希; born 1997), Japanese dancer, model, and actress
- Nozomi Furuki (古木 のぞみ; born 1988), Japanese voice actress
- Nozomi Hara (原 希美; born 1991), Japanese handball player
- Nozomi Hatakeyama (畠山 希美; born 2008), Japanese member of idol group AKB48
- Nozomi Hiroyama (廣山 望; born 1975), Japanese former professional footballer
- Nozomi Kawahara (川原 希; born 1970), Japanese professional golfer
- Nozomi Kawasaki (川崎 希; born 1987), Japanese tarento and gravure idol
- Nozomi Kimura (木村 のぞみ; born 1997), Chilean footballer
- Nozomi Komuro (小室 希; born 1985), Japanese skeleton racer
- Nozomi Maeda (前田 希美; born 1993), Japanese model and actress
- Nozomi Masu (升 望; born 1980), Japanese voice actress
- Nozomi Momoi (桃井 望; 1978–2002), Japanese AV idol
- Nozomi Nishida (西田 望見; born 1990), Japanese voice actress and singer
- Nozomi Nishimura American biomedical engineer
- Nozomi Ōhashi (大橋 のぞみ; born 1999), Japanese former child actress and singer
- Nozomi Okuhara (奥原 希望; born 1995), Japanese badminton player
- Nozomi Ōsaka (逢坂 望美), Japanese animator
- Nozomi Osako (大迫 希; born 1990), Japanese football player
- Nozomi Sasaki (model) (佐々木 希; born 1988), Japanese actress, model, tarento, YouTuber and singer
- Nozomi Sasaki (voice actress) (ささき のぞみ; born 1983), Japanese voice actress
- Nozomi Satō (佐藤 希望; born 1983), Japanese fencer
- Nozomi Shimizu (清水 望; born 1996), Japanese badminton player
- Nozomi Sunouchi (簾内 望; born 1965), Japanese swimmer
- Nozomi Takeuchi (竹内 のぞみ/竹内 希実; born 1980), Japanese gravure idol, and a female talent
- Nozomi Tanaka (田中 希実; born 1999), Japanese long-distance runner
- Nozomi Tsuchida (土田 望未; born 1986), Japanese female volleyball player
- Nozomi Tsuji (辻 希美; born 1987), Japanese media personality, singer, and blogger
- Nozomi Watanabe (渡辺 心; born 1971), Japanese former ice dancer
- Nozomi Yamago (山郷 のぞみ; born 1975), Japanese former football player
- Nozomi Yamamoto (山本 希望; born 1988), Japanese voice actress and rapper

== People with the surname ==
- Kōta Nozomi (望 公太; born 1986), Japanese novelist

== Fictional characters ==
- Nozomi Harasaki (原崎 望), a character in the video game Shenmue
- Nozomi Kaibara (柏原 ノゾミ), a character from the anime series Chance Pop Session
- Nozomi Kasaki, (傘木 希美), a character from the novel series Sound! Euphonium and one of the main characters in Liz and the Blue Bird
- Nozomi Kaminashi (神無 のぞみ), a character in the manga series Keijo
- Nozomi Kinki, a character from Inazuma Eleven.
- Nozomi Kiriya (霧谷 希), a character from the light novel, manga/anime series Mayoi Neko Overrun!
- Nozomi Kujō (九条 望実), a character in the anime series Bleach
- Nozomi Sakurai (桜井 のぞみ), one of the three main characters in the anime Kamisama Minarai: Himitsu no Cocotama
- Nozomi Sasagawa (笹川 ノゾミ), a character from the anime series Little Battlers Experience WARS
- Nozomi Shirakawa (白河 望), a character in the film Linda Linda Linda
- Nozomi Sōgetsu, a character from Inazuma Eleven GO.
- Nozomi Suemitsu (末光 望美), a character in the video game Persona 3
- Nozomi Watabe (渡部 望み), a character in manga series Haikyū!!, the position is Libero and the number is #7.
- Nozomi Yumehara (夢原 のぞみ), a character from the anime metaseries Yes! PreCure 5
- Nozomi Tachibana (橘 ノゾミ), a character from the game series Blue Archive
- Nozomi Tōjō (東條 希), a character from the anime series Love Live! School Idol Project
- Nozomi (希), a character from the anime series Sonny Boy.
- Nozomi (ノゾミ), a character in the visual novel Akai Ito.

== See also ==
- Nozomi (disambiguation)
- Nozomu
