= Devor =

Devor is a surname. Notable people with the surname include:

- Aaron Devor (born 1951), Canadian sociologist and sexologist
- Anna Devor (born 1972), Israeli-American biomedical engineer
- Richard E. DeVor (1944–2011), American engineer and academic
- Robinson Devor, American film director and screenwriter
