= Valentina Emiliani =

Italian physicist and CNRS researcher

- Born: Rome, Italy
- Education: Sapienza University of Rome (PhD, 1997)
- Awards: CNRS Médaille d'argent (2021); ERC Advanced Grant (2020); Irène Joliot-Curie Prize (2025); Michael S. Feld Biophotonics Award (2022)
- Scientific career
- Fields: Neurophotonics, Optics
- Workplaces: Institut de la Vision, Paris; CNRS

Valentina Emiliani is an Italian physicist and CNRS Research Director at the Institut de la Vision in Paris. She heads the Photonics Department and the Wavefront Modulation team at the institute.

== Early life and career ==
Emiliani studied physics at Sapienza University of Rome, graduating in 1991. She completed her doctorate in physics at the same university in 1997, with a thesis on the optical properties of quantum structures. She then undertook postdoctoral research at the Max Born Institute in Berlin, followed by a period at the European Laboratory for Nonlinear Spectroscopy in Florence.

In 2002, Emiliani joined the Institut Jacques Monod in Paris as a postdoctoral fellow. In 2004, she was recruited as a researcher at the CNRS. In 2005, she received a European Young Investigator grant and established the Wavefront Engineering Microscopy group at Paris Descartes University. She was promoted to CNRS Research Director in 2011.

In 2014, she became director of the Neurophotonics laboratory at Paris Descartes University. In 2018, she joined the Institut de la Vision with her team and took over the Photonics Department.

== Research ==
Emiliani's research focuses on the application of wavefront modulation techniques to neuroscience. Her research has developed methods combining computer-generated holography and temporal focusing with optogenetics to control neuronal activity. In 2020, she received an ERC Advanced Grant for the HOLOVIS project, aimed at the optical manipulation of visual circuits.

== Awards ==
Year	Award	Awarding body
2005	European Young Investigator Award	European Science Foundation
2015	Coups d'élan pour la recherche française	Bettencourt Schueller Foundation
2018	AXA Chair in Research	AXA Research Fund
2020	ERC Advanced Grant (HOLOVIS)	European Research Council
2021	Médaille d'argent	CNRS
2021	Maxime Dahan Prize	French Physical Society
2022	Michael S. Feld Biophotonics Award	Optica (formerly OSA)
2025	Irène Joliot-Curie Prize, Woman Scientist of the Year	French Ministry of Higher Education
