= Awesomenauts =

2012 video game

- Developer: Ronimo Games
- Publishers: Windows, OS X, Linux, Xbox One, PS4; Ronimo Games (2012-2023); Atari (2023-); PS3, Xbox 360; DTP Entertainment
- Platforms: PlayStation 3, Xbox 360, Windows, OS X, Linux, PlayStation 4, Xbox One
- Release: 2 May 2012: PS3, Xbox 360 2 May 2012 Windows 1 August 2012 OS X 7 December 2012 Linux 29 May 2013 PS4 4 March 2014 Xbox One 7 September 2016
- Genre: MOBA
- Mode: Multiplayer

Awesomenauts is a multiplayer online battle arena (MOBA) video game developed by Dutch company Ronimo Games. The game was released for PlayStation 3 and Xbox 360 consoles in May 2012, and Windows in August 2012. It was ported to OS X and Linux. Another version of the game, Awesomenauts Assemble!, incorporating all the changes and additions available on Windows, OS X and Linux, was released for the PlayStation 4 in March 2014 and for the Xbox One in September 2016.

In May 2017, the Windows version of the game transitioned to a free-to-play title, incorporating an in-game currency and reward system to allow players to gain access to new characters and other customization aspects. In September 2019, Ronimo Games announced that development on the game had stopped indefinitely. Despite this, Awesomenauts was still available to play until the servers went offline on September 15, 2023, due to Ronimo's bankruptcy. In 2025, the game was acquired by Atari and relaunched as a paid title, re-introducing matchmaking and other online features.

== Gameplay ==
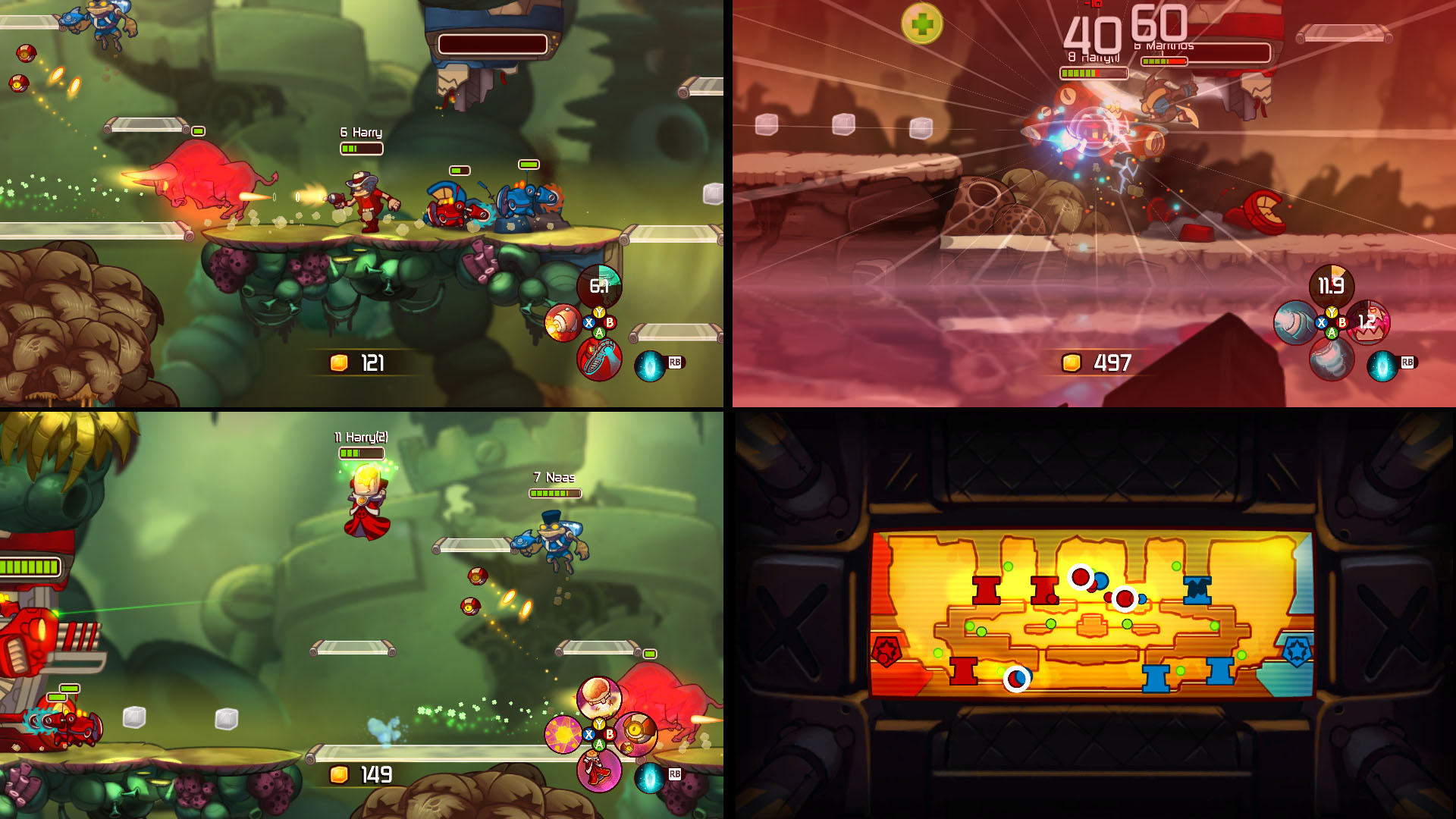
Split-screen mode for three local players, including the common megamap (bottom right) for all three

Awesomenauts is a multiplayer online battle arena (MOBA) incorporating elements from 2D platformer and fighting games. At the start of a match, a player selects from one of the available characters known as "Awesomenauts". In addition to unique looks and voice-over work, each Awesomenaut has a vastly different set of base attributes such as health, movement speed, and attack strength, and regular and special attack moves.

In the game's primary match mode, two teams of three characters, selected before the match, are pitted against each other, with the goal to destroy the other's team's Solar Collector within the enemy's team base before the others do the same. Both teams have to fight their way through enemy players, automatic drones, and turrets that block the path until destroyed. Some maps contain other obstacles, such as a giant pit monster that consumes anything immediately above it that can be summoned by standing on a button. Upon death, the player may respawn back at their base after a short delay that gets longer as the game progresses. Maps include health pickups and Solar units, the game's currency. When a player kills an enemy or a turret, every member of the team earns Solar. When a team destroys a turret, a super-drone is generated that can take and deal more damage as it heads towards the enemy base.

As the player earns Solar, they can return to their base (either by moving there or through a short teleportation sequence) to heal and spend the Solar on various upgrades to these skill sets or character attributes. For each of four areas – the two special skills, the regular attack, and general attributes – the player can buy up to three of six available improvements, with some improvements which can be bought multiple times with benefits stacked. With the release of the "Starstorm" expansion, each match also features team experience and levels. The game starts both teams at level 1, and experience is collectively earned through killing enemy drones or Awesomenauts or taking out turrets. Each level slight improves base attribute values for all characters on that team, such as attack strength and healing rates, up to a maximum level of 20.

The default game mode is ranked play, which puts players into 9 different ranks and attempts to match players within these ranks; Romino Games subsequently will reward players that finish at the top ranks on the completion of a season before resetting all rankings. The game's servers will adjust the player's ranking depending on their performance. Within ranked play, no team can have two or more players using the same Awesomenaut character. If necessary, computer-controlled opponents will be used to fill out a team, and if a player drops out of a match, they will be replaced by a computer opponent. Other modes allow for more variations but do not contribute towards ranking. Such modes include skirmishes where the singular character limit is removed, and round-robin modes where every time a player is killed, they are randomly assigned to a new Awesomenaut. Single and local players can also engage in practice matches against computer-controlled teams.

== Development ==
Awesomenauts was announced for Xbox Live Arcade and PlayStation Network on 19 May 2011 in a press release from publisher DTP Entertainment. The project was supported by the Dutch Game Garden, a studio incubation program. The first playable build of the game was revealed for and played by the attending press at E3 2011. A release date of 2 May 2012 was later announced by developer Ronimo Games on 3 March 2012. The game was ported to Windows and Steam on 1 August 2012, with an OS X version arriving on 7 December 2012, and a Linux version on 29 May 2013.

Ronimo Games announced a PlayStation 4 release, co-developed with Abstraction Games, with improvements and updates from the PC version, as well as DLC, on 14 August 2013, intended for release with the console's launch. The PlayStation 4 version, entitled Awesomenauts Assemble!, was released on 4 March 2014, following a delay to the console's launch window. On 2 June 2014, Ronimo Games announced an Xbox One version of the game, originally slated for Summer 2015 but later delayed to Fall of the same year.

Built on the second version of in-house 2D engine Ronitech, originally developed for Swords & Soldiers, Awesomenauts was described by Ronimo Games' Joost van Dongen as a MOBA combined with platforming elements, similar to but significantly different from other games in the same genre such as League of Legends and Defense of the Ancients. Ronimo Games specifically created for the upgraded engine a number of real-time editing tools for levels, animations, and effects, largely non-existent in the development of previous titles, for use in developing the game.

The game's art style and direction were stated by Ronimo Games as being inspired by colorful, over-the-top animated series from the 1980s. Music for the game was produced in partnership with award-winning Dutch recording studio SonicPicnic. The game was updated regularly by Ronimo with new characters, balance changes, game modes, UI updates, visual overhauls, and matchmaking improvements since its release.

=== Starstorm expansion ===
In August 2013, Ronimo games started a Kickstarter campaign for additional content entitled Awesomenauts: Starstorm. The goal of the project was $125,000. By the end of the campaign, over $345,000 had been donated, with PayPal bringing the total to over $400,000. Several stretch goals were reached, including a new map, a replay system, and a spectator mode. In addition to the three new characters planned for the paid DLC expansion (Ted McPain, Skree, and Sentry X-58), two extra characters were included after stretch goals for them were met (Penny Fox and Nibbs).

Ronimo Games' studio head Jasper Koning said the company opted to go to Kickstarter for further development due to their bad experiences with their console publisher DTP Entertainment, who had gone bankrupt after Awesomenauts released on console, but whom they still must pay from every sale of the game.

=== Overdrive expansion ===
A second paid DLC for Awesomenauts, named Awesomenauts: Overdrive and featuring three new characters (Professor Milton Yoolip, Chucho Krokk, and Jimmy and the LUX5000), was released on 3 March 2016. The release of the expansion was accompanied by the release of several new free features for all players, including matchmaking improvements, a new character (Ix the Interloper), and a graphical update for the character Sheriff Lonestar. Later Max Focus was also added to this expansion.

=== Transition to free-to-play ===
In April 2017, Ronimo announced that they would transition the personal computer version of the game into a free-to-play title by May 2017 with the game's 4.0 update, which was completed on 24 May 2017. In the free-to-play version, players earn in-game currency, Awesomepoints, for winning matches, which can be used to purchase characters, player icons, and other customization options in the game's store. Players gain experience towards a player level, while also leveling up each of the characters when they play as that character; leveling (player or character) will reward the player with Awesomepoints or other customization options. As many players had purchased the game and downloadable content before this point, Ronimo provided a transition scheme that those players were automatically given credit for owning specific characters and other customization options, along with unique customization options establishing the player as a "founder" to others.

=== Closure of servers ===
On 23 August 2023, Emerce reported that Ronimo had been declared bankrupt by the Central Netherlands court the day prior. While the in-game matches for Awesomenauts utilized peer-to-peer matchmaking, the Overdrive expansion update also changed how matchmaking would be handled, which it, along with other metagame services, relied on a central server to function. Due to the closure, the central server for Awesomenauts would close on 15 September 2023. While Ronimo has not provided an official announcement about the closure of its studio or the state of the game, several developers have spoken out about the situation and have helped players continue playing Awesomenauts. Jasper Koning, co-founder of Ronimo, posted on the Steam Discussion forum for the game on 18 September 2023, detailing how players can switch back to a previous version of Awesomenauts, before the Galactron matchmaking update, that relied on Steam's backend tools, Steamworks, for matchmaking and networking instead of Ronimo's central server.

=== Atari acquisition and relaunch ===
After Ronimo's bankruptcy in 2023, Awesomenauts was acquired by Atari the same year.

In 2025 the game was re-launched as a paid title, now including the Starstorm and Overdrive expansions in the base game, and restoring features such as matchmaking and global chat that became unavailable when the previous central server went offline.

== Reception ==
Reception

Aggregate score
Aggregator	Score
Metacritic	PS3: 75/100; X360: 77/100; PC: 78/100; PS4: 74/100; XONE: 81/100

Review scores
Publication	Score
Eurogamer	7.0/10
Game Informer	8.5/10
GameSpot	8.0/10
GamesRadar+	8.0/10
IGN	7.0/10
PC Gamer (UK)	8.0/10

Upon release, Awesomenauts received fairly positive reviews, earning Metacritic scores of 75/100 and 77/100. The PlayStation 4 version of the game, Awesomenauts Assemble!, earned a Metacritic score of 74/100 following its release on 4 March 2014.

Most critics have praised the game's utilization of streamlined elements of the MOBA genre and their accessibility to newcomers, especially those on consoles. GameSpot's Austin Light noted that Awesomenauts "serves as an excellent introduction to the genre for the uninitiated and is a fun spin on familiar tropes for MOBA veterans."

In his review, IGN's Mitch Dyer stated that the game "distills a complicated, largely PC-only genre down to its essence, and it does so mostly successfully."

=== Sales ===
The game sold close to one million copies by August 2013.
