= Solo Live 2004 (Live at "Studio F") =

Studio album by Toshiko Akiyoshi
- Released: 14 October 2009
- Recorded: 2004
- Studio: Studio F, Tajimi, Gifu
- Genre: jazz
- Length: 52:12
- Label: Studio Songs (Japan)

Toshiko Akiyoshi chronology
Vintage (2008)	Solo Live 2004 (Live at "Studio F") (2009)	Classic Encounters (2010)

Solo Live 2004 (Live at "Studio F") is a recording by jazz pianist Toshiko Akiyoshi, released in 2009 on the Studio Songs record label in Japan.

== Track listing ==
1. "Long Yellow Road" (Akiyoshi) – 5:21
2. "Day Dream" (Strayhorn, Ellington, La Touche) – 7:02
3. "After You've Gone" (Layton, Creamer) – 4:04
4. "Kanchororin Bushi" aka "Children in the Temple Ground" (traditional) – 6:17
5. "Deep River" (traditional) – 5:08
6. "When You Wish upon a Star" (Harline, Washington) – 4:44
7. "Central Park West" (Coltrane) – 6:08
8. "'Round About Midnight" (Monk) – 6:35
9. "Hope" (Akiyoshi) – 3:48
10. "Tico Tico" (de Abreu) – 3:05

== Personnel ==
- Toshiko Akiyoshi – piano
