= Nozomu =

- Gender: Male

Origin
- Origin: Japanese
- Meaning: Different meanings depending on the kanji used

Nozomu (望, Nozomu) is a masculine Japanese given name. Notable people with the name include:

== People with the name ==
- Nozomu Fujita (藤田 望; born 1984), Japanese rugby union player
- Nozomu Kasagi (笠木 望; born 1974), Japanese film director
- Nozomu Kato (加藤 望; born 1969), Japanese footballer
- Nozomu Matsumoto (松本 望; 1905–1988), Japanese businessman and inventor
- Nozomu Sahashi (猿橋 望; born 1951), Japanese businessman
- Nozomu Sasaki (佐々木 望; born 1967), Japanese voice actor
- Nozomu Suzuki (鈴木 望; 1949–2024), Japanese politician
- Nozomu Tamaki (環 望; born 1966), Japanese manga artist
- Nozomu Yoshioka (吉岡 希; born 2003), Japanese figure skater

== Fictional characters ==
- Nozomu Amachi (天知 望), a character in the tokusatsu series Tensou Sentai Goseiger
- Nozomu Itoshiki (糸色 望), the main character in Sayonara, Zetsubou-Sensei

== See also ==
- Nozomi (given name)
