= Nozomi Sasaki (model) =

Japanese model, actress, and singer (born 1988)

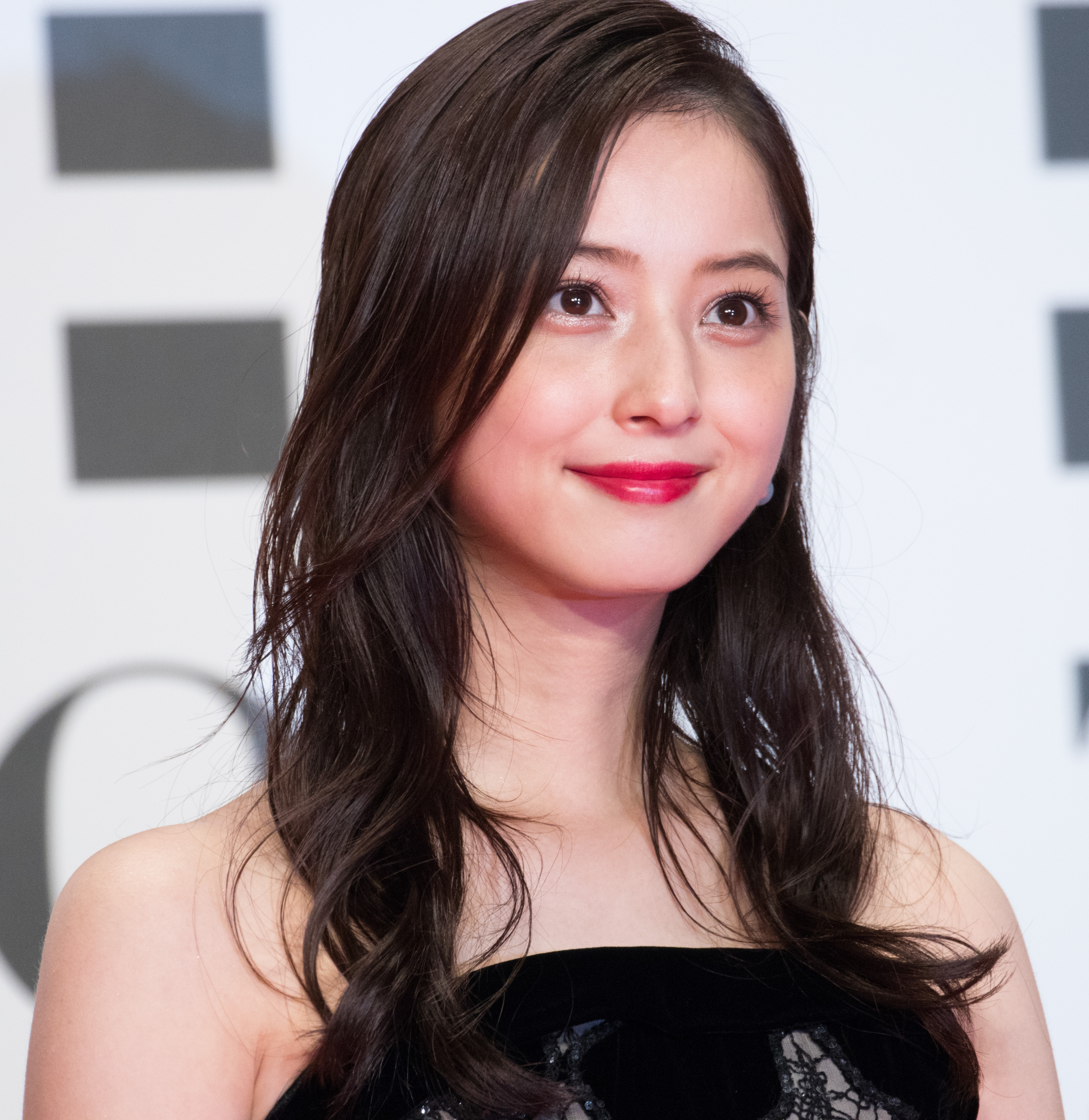
- Sasaki in 2016
- Born: February 8, 1988 (age 38); Iijima, Akita, Japan
- Other names: Present; Nozomi Watabe (after marriage); Past: Butterfly Knife; Icepick; Maiden in Black; No Mercy
- Occupations: Actress; model; tarento; YouTuber
- Years active: 2002–present
- Agent: Top Coat
- Notable work: Kaitō Royale; Tenshi no Koi; Ju-on: Beginning of the End
- Height: 168 cm (5 ft 6 in)
- Spouse: Ken Watabe (m. 2017)
- Children: 2

YouTube information
- Channel: 佐々木希(仮)
- Years active: 2024–present
- Genre: Vlog
- Subscribers: 477 thousand
- Views: 27 million

Japanese name
- Kanji: 佐々 木希
- Hiragana: ささき のぞみ
Transcriptions
- Romanization: Sasaki Nozomi
- Last updated: February 6, 2026

Nozomi Sasaki (佐々木 希, Sasaki Nozomi; born February 8, 1988 in Akita City, Japan), previously known simply as Nozomi during her fashion modeling career, is a Japanese actress, glamour model, tarento, YouTuber, singer, and professional fashion model.

After working as a fashion model for nearly 7 years, she has become famous as a gravure idol and main ringside commentator / spokesperson for the mixed martial arts competition Dream Fighting Championships and the kickboxing competition K-1 World Max since 2009.

Since late 2008 she has released eight photobooks and three DVDs, and has also made countless appearances on television, magazines, and ads unrelated to fashion / cosmetic, including ones for Coca-Cola's green tea products, Suntory's 3 soft drink products, So-net, Willcom, Fujifilm, Kao, Rohto Pharmaceutical Co. and Seiko's Tisse brand line created for and dedicated to her. She has also endorsed an accessory brand, Cotton Cloud, since June 2010 when it was created for her and its first flag shop opened in Harajuku.

In 2010, she started her music career, debuting with the single "Kamu to Funyan" (噛むとフニャン) which featured rapper Astro and was used in the tie-in commercials for Lotte Fit's Chewing Gum. Sasaki's debut album Nozomi Collection was released on April 18, 2012.

== Career ==
=== Modeling ===
Sasaki began modeling at the age of around 14. She modeled mainly in the collection circuit, and for fashion / cosmetic advertisements. In the later years of her modeling career, she was a featured model and contributor to the now defunct Pinky magazine. She first appeared on the cover of Pinky in July 2007, along with another cover girl, Emi Suzuki.

One theory suggests that Suzuki was the person who brought Sasaki to the commercial modeling field after she discovered Sasaki when Sasaki was planning to retire from modeling, and it has been noted that Sasaki already appeared at the time to be significantly chubbier than she used to be.

She was the model of Japanese magazine, "PINKY", "non-no", "Oggi"; currently, she is the model of "with". (refer to the external link below)

=== Gravure ===
After further intentionally gaining weight, she began appearing as a glamour model (gravure idol) on the youth-targeted weekly manga magazine Young Jump in 2005, and in the Pinky fashion magazine in 2006. She made her first landing on the top cover of Young Jump in May 2007.

Nozomi Sasaki released her first photobook, Nozomi, in August 2008, and her first DVD, Weekly Young Jump Premium DVD: nozomi, in September 2009. She released her second DVD, Dolly, and two photobooks, Sasaki Nozomi in Tenshi no Koi and Non, in 2009.

In early 2010 she was specially featured by 2.4 million selling manga series Usogui on Young Jump, and released her fourth photobook Prism. Despite her breast size which has been known as one of the smallest in the gravure scene, she became a successful model by the end of 2010 in the field where breast size is regarded as a vital factor.

At that time she also began appearing on the Non-no magazine, a biweekly girl-next-door-orientated fashion magazine that does not usually feature people like her. Though after becoming more of a gravure idol than a professional model, Sasaki was heavily featured in a spring fashion collection presented by the magazine and BS-TBS, and soon after that, she landed on the top cover of the magazine. These appearances have been described as like an "invasion", as she has significantly changed the magazine's tone. Some critics have suggested that the magazine has been destroyed by Nozomi Sasaki.

=== Television, film, and print ===
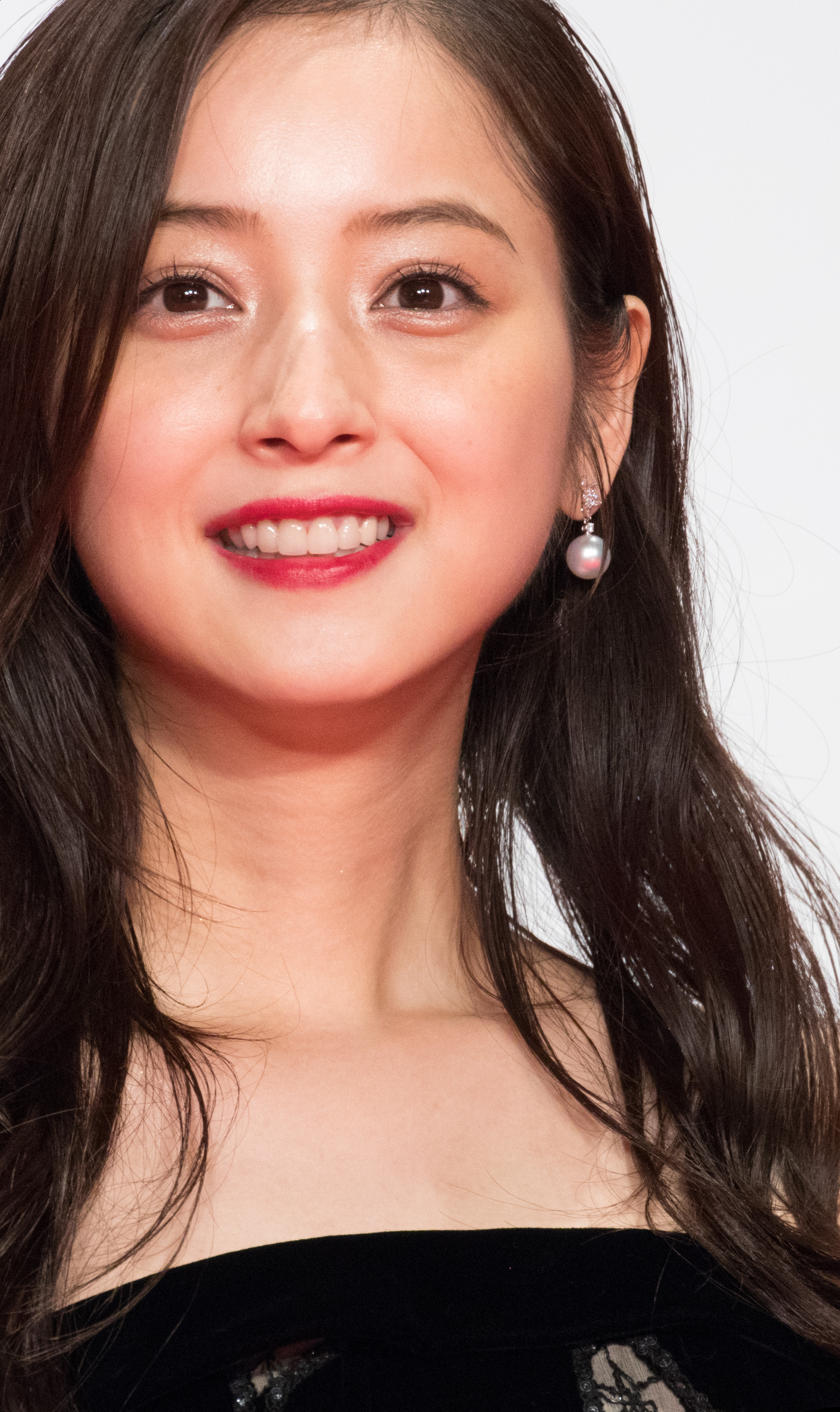
Sasaki at the Tokyo International Film Festival

She has regularly appeared on over 10 television programs and over 20 television commercials since 2009. Her first huge hit on the TV scene was a TV commercial for Lotte's new chewing gum product Fit's, where she performed a "silly dance" called the Fit's dance. Fit's became a smash hit, selling over 40 million in its first 5 months in the Japanese gum market where 4 million-per-year is considered large success.

In March 2009, she was chosen as the image character for a special advertising campaign by the Japan Magazine Publishers Association, a governmental publishing trade association run by the Ministry of Education. During the campaign between July 21, 2009 – August 20, 2009, her portrait appeared in 300 different magazines and as 30,000 posters for bookstores and public libraries all over Japan, 100,000 posters hung in trains in the Tokyo metropolitan area and the Kansai area, and 2,009 prepaid cards.

Having made a cameo appearance in the romantic comedy Handsome Suit as well as minor roles in two television serials, Sasaki scored a major breakthrough in her budding acting career with the lead role in the 2009 sentimental romance film Tenshi no Koi, where she played a teenage girl in a fragile relationship with an older man played by Shosuke Tanihara. The film became an instant hit and was also distributed in some nearby countries such as Hong Kong, Taiwan, and Singapore. In 2010, she acted in the television drama Dohyo Girl where she played a model who became the coach of a high school sumo team. This was the first time in her acting career that she took the lead role in a television drama series.

She also made her singing debut in July 2010 with the catch phrase "Heta de Gomenne!" ("Forgive my bad singing!") when she released a single, Kamu to Funyan feat. Astro, which debuted at number one on the Oricon singles chart. At the end of 2010 she released her second single titled Jin Jin Jingle Bell, a cover version of Chisato Moritaka's 1995 hit. She was expected to participate in the NHK Kohaku show, an annual New Year's Eve musical TV show, but when she was asked about it by the press during the commemoration event for Jin Jin Jingle Bell, she stated that she did not wish to appear on it. She stated that she could not sing and was shy, implying she would never perform her songs live in public. As a result, she did not attend the show.

=== K-1 and Dream ===
Immediately following the firing of the predecessor, Akina Minami, she was picked as the ringside commentator for K-1. Soon after this, she was also selected by Dream as the ringside commentator. Since then, she has worked for these two combat sport competitions not only as the ringside commentator but also as a spokesperson since April 2009. She immediately established a good reputation. Remy Bonjasky has referred to her as a "good one", "Oh, well I think she's good, she seems too calm, at least way better than that one I saw at the previous World GP". Gago Drago commented "You know, she's uncannily reticent compared to other ringside gals I know, but in a way it's good, you know, especially during a fight!". Buakaw Por. Pramuk commented after K-1 World MAX 2009 World Championship Tournament Final, "Immediately after the bout, that girl gave me a towel with her awesome smile. It killed all of my pain!". In Dream, many fighters, including Joachim Hansen, JZ Calvan, Zelg Galešić, Choi Hong-man, Paulo Filho, James Thompson, Bibiano Fernandes, Kultar Gill, Sergei Kharitonov and Josh Barnett, have positively made highly-extolling comments about the new face, resulting in being described as gullible cherry boys by Rin Takanashi on Twitter. Only a few criticisms have been levelled at her, notably, Badr Hari has stated that he thinks the predecessor and the heavyweight division's long-term commentator Norika Fujiwara were better because he finds her "somehow ominous".

=== Public reception ===
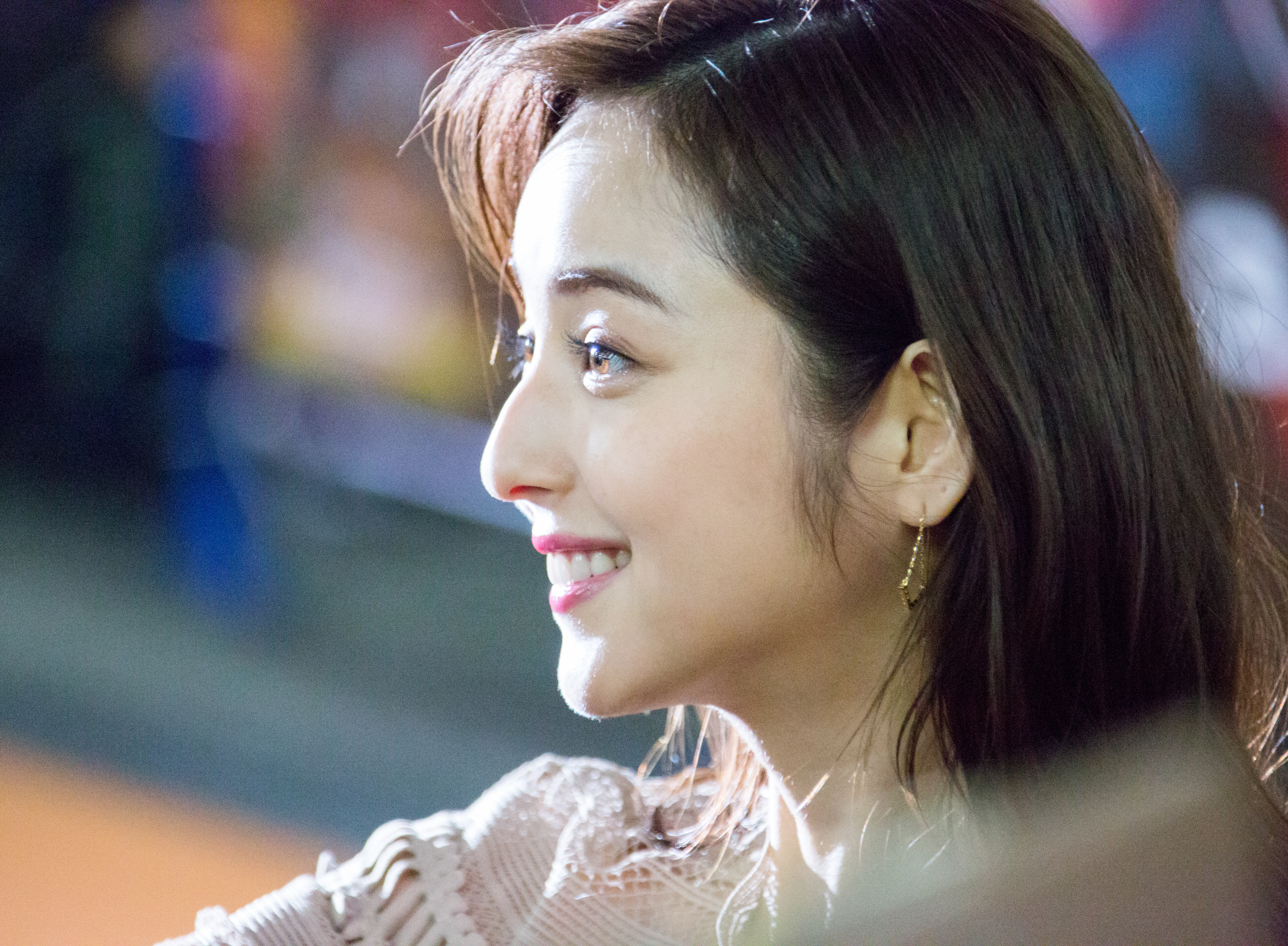
Sasaki at the Kong: Skull Island Japan Premiere Red Carpet 2018

Since she debuted as a glamour model, she has been known for her doll-like image attributed to her looks and manners, hence her first full-scale DVD's title "Dolly".

Unlike her mentor, Emi Suzuki, who has rejected nearly all interview requests even after beginning to appear in the general celebrity scene, Sasaki has normally granted interviews since 2009 when she began appearing in the general celebrity scene. She often speaks in her native language, the Akita dialect, which people outside of the northern region hardly understand, thus, the press chasing her are often with translators. It has also been known that some reporters have been banned from interviewing her, and they are mainly those who have attempted to ask her questions about her past, specifically, her fashion modeling years. The topic of her fashion modeling years has occasionally become a matter of public interest, although she has never spoken about it. In April 2010 a photographer mentioned Sasaki in an interview, saying he witnessed Sasaki's first meeting with Yukina Kinoshita, a commercial model who has been known as a notorious brawler, a claimed former member of a bosozoku gang, and has become Sasaki's co-worker. The photographer apparently, in 2008, witnessed their pre-brawling scene where Kinoshita picked a fight with Sasaki, pouncing on Sasaki, but Kinoshita got away from it after Sasaki caught Kinoshita's arm, staring at her, and Kinoshita got "seriously freaked out". Kinoshita later commented on this shortly before her retirement, confirming it and describing Sasaki as something on a different level from a mere brawler, which makes her "gang" past highly questionable.

In August 2010, she landed on the cover of the anan magazine, with a black dress and a body shape slightly reminiscent of her past as a fashion model. At that time she signed a new endorsement contract with FinePix of Fujifilm and attended its ceremonial press conference, with another black dress designed by her former fan Razor Ramon HG and a body shape fairly reminiscent of her past as a fashion model. Some of the fashion press made mention of these appearances. The September number of the Ray magazine headlined "Nozomi» has returned?", and associated the black dresses with some of her past nicknames related to the black color such as "Black Surgeon / Black Maiden". Sankei Shimbun, also featured this appearance, referring to her as "Nozomi".

In November 2010, Akita Prefecture chose her as one of the two official PR-Ambassadors, along with Natsuki Kato, with the purpose of creating a better image of the prefecture. The mayor Norihisa Satake officially commented on the selection that he was hoping that she would eradicate Akita's image being snowy and dark, with her image being fine and cheerful.

== Personal life ==
Nozomi Sasaki was born on February 8, 1988, in the town of Iijima (now part of Akita City), Akita Prefecture. She has one older brother.

=== Marriage ===
On April 11, 2017, Sasaki married comedian and television presenter Ken Watabe, who is sixteen years her senior, after dating for two years. She announced on her Instagram that she and her husband had welcomed the birth of their first child, a son, born September 13, 2018.

In June 2020, Shūkan Bunshun published allegations that Sasaki's husband had been involved in extramarital affairs throughout their relationship, some of which involved secret meetings at accessible toilet restrooms in Roppongi Hills, and for which he would pay his partner ¥10,000 yen in cash. Watabe admitted to the relationships and apologized for his behavior, cancelling several of his public appearances.

Despite the news of Watabe's extramarital affairs, she announced that she was expecting their second child in November 2022. The couple announced the birth of their second child, a daughter, on April 27, 2023.

== Bibliography ==
=== Magazines ===
- Pinky, Shueisha 2004–2009, as an exclusive model from 2006 to 2009
- Non-no, Shueisha 1971–, as a regular model from January 2010 to 2013
- Oggi, Shogakukan 1991–, as a regular model since 2010
- With, Kodansha 1981–, as a regular model since 2013

=== Photobooks ===
- Nozomi (August 1, 2008 Shueisha) ISBN 9784081020751
- Sasaki Nozomi in Tenshi no Koi (October 31, 2009 Kadokawa) ISBN 9784048949248
- Non (November 21, 2009 Shueisha) ISBN 9784087805468
- Prism (March 30, 2010 Gentosha) ISBN 9784344018013
- Nozokimi (July, 2010 Gentosha) ISBN 9784344414785
- Non♡non (December 1, 2011 Shueisha) ISBN 9784087806342
- Sasakiki (September 5, 2013 Shueisha) ISBN 9784087806939
- Kakushigoto (September 26, 2016 Kodansha) ISBN 9784062202497

=== Calendar ===
- "Making Eye Contact With You" (April 15, 2026)

== Discography ==
=== Singles ===
- "Kamu to Funyan" (噛むとフニャン) feat. Astro (2010 July 21, Sony Music Japan)
- "Jin Jin Jingle Bell" (ジン ジン ジングルベル) feat. Pentaphonic (2010 November 24, Sony Music Japan)
- "Happy Beep Happy Beep Happy Beep Po" (パペピプ♪パピペプ♪パペピプポ♪) (2011 October 26, Sony Music Japan)

=== Albums ===
- Nozomi Collection (2012 April 18, Sony Music Japan)

== DVDs ==
- Nozomi [DVD] ([IV] Nozomi Sasaki – Weekly Young Jump Premium)
- Dolly [DVD] (Nozomi Sasaki Dolly)
- Nozomi Sasaki Holy Land Bali [DVD]

== Filmography ==
=== Film ===
- The Handsome Suit (2008), Remi
- Tenshi No Koi (2009), Rio Ozawa
- Afro Tanaka (2012), Aya Kato
- Paikaji Nankai Sakusen (2012), Kimi
- Sango Ranger (2013), Risa Shimabukuro
- Fu-Zoku Changed My Life (2013), Kayo
- Ju-on: Beginning of the End (2014), Yui Ikuno
- The Furthest End Awaits (2015), Eriko Yamazaki
- Ju-on: The Final (2015), Yui Shōno
- Enishi: The Bride of Izumo (2016), Maki Īzuka
- Lost and Found (2016), Nanami Kiyokawa
- Kanon (2016), Akane Kishimoto
- Desperate Sunflowers (2016), Marina Kamiya
- My Korean Teacher (Ikinawa Sensei) (2016), Sakura
- The Last Cop: The Movie (2017), Yui Suzuki
- Tokyo Ghoul (2017), Kaya Irimi
- Rika: Love Obsessed Psycho (2021), Naomi Umemoto
- Red Shoes (2023)
- Shinji Muroi: Not Defeated (2024)
- Shinji Muroi: Stay Alive (2024)
- A Girl & Her Guard Dog (2025), Kaori Sekiya
- Sato and Sato (2025), Risa Yoshida

=== Television ===
- Kami no Shizuku (2009, NTV) as Sara
- Shaken Baby! (2010, Fuji TV) as Sakurako Seo
- Straight Man (2010, Fuji TV and Kansai TV) as Yukie Kayashima
- Dohyo Girl (2010, MBS) as Hikaru Wakabayashi
- Sazae-san 3 (2011, Fuji TV) as the future (fictional) Hanako Hanazawa
- Propose Kyodai (2011, Fuji TV) as Minami Watanabe
- Kaito Royale (2011, TBS) as Sister Snake
- All She Was Worth (2011, TV Asahi) as Kyoko Shinjō
- Koi Nante Zeitaku ga Watashi ni Ochite Kuru no Darouka? (2012, Fuji TV)
- TOKYO Airport: Air Traffic Controller (2012, Fuji TV) as Mana Sakai
- Otenki Onee-san (2013, TV Asahi) as Akane Hashimoto
- Yonimo Kimyō na Monogatari 2013 Haru no Tokubetsuhen (2013, Fuji TV) as Misaki Yoshida
- Umi no Ue no Sinryōjo (2013, Fuji TV) as Aki Shirai
- Koi Suru Eve (2013, NTV) as Nao Nanami
- Hoshi Shinichi Mystery Special Kiri no Hoshi de (2014, Fuji TV)
- First Class (2014, Fuji TV) as Miina
- Cabin Attendant Keiji: New York Satsujin Jiken (2014, Fuji TV) as Haruka Mano
- A Chef of Nobunaga (2014, TV Asahi) as Karen
- Hissatsu Shigotonin 2014 (2014, TV Asahi) as Otū
- Kurofuku Monogatari (2014, TV Asahi) as Kyōko
- Kekkon ni Ichiban Chikakute Tōi Onna(2015, NTV) as Kanna Satō
- Scapegoat (2015, Wowow) as Mayu Misaki
- I'm Home (2015, TV Asahi) as Mari Nishizawa
- The Last Cop (2015, NTV) as Yui Suzuki
- Shizumanu Taiyō (2016, Wowow)
- Fukuyado Honpo: Kyoto Love Story (2016)
- Ame ga Furu to Kimi wa Yasashii (2017, Hulu)
- The Many Faces of Ito (2018, Netflix), Tomomi Shimahara (A)
- The Supporting Actors 3 (2021, TV Tokyo), Herself
- Come Come Everybody (2022, NHK), Nana Sasagawa
- Youtuber ni Musume wa Yaran (2022, TV Tokyo), Taira Chisa
- Ameku Takao's Detective Karte (2025), Mazuru Ameku

=== Japanese dub ===
- Kong: Skull Island (2017), Mason Weaver (voice-over for Brie Larson)
