= Kibo =

Kibo may refer to:

- Kibō (ISS module), Japanese Experiment Module (JEM), component of the International Space Station
- Kibo, a volcanic cone forming the main summit of Mount Kilimanjaro (see §Toponymy)
- An alias of James "Kibo" Parry, who as "Kibo" became a cult figure on Usenet in the early 1990s for posting numerous humorous messages
- Kibo (spider), a genus of jumping spiders
- Kibō no Tō, a political party in Japan
- Board game record

== See also ==
- Kybo, scouting term for an outhouse
