= My Rainy Days =

2009 film by Yuri Kanchiku

- Theatrical release poster
- Directed by: Yuri Kanchiku
- Written by: Yuri Kanchiku
- Produced by: Yasushi Umemura
- Starring: Nozomi Sasaki; Shosuke Tanihara
- Cinematography: Shin'ichi Kakuta
- Edited by: Emi Onodera
- Music by: indigo blue; Zentaro Watanabe
- Production company: Sedic Deux
- Distributed by: Gaga Communications
- Release dates: 17 October 2009 (Tokyo); 7 November 2009 (Japan)
- Running time: 119 minutes
- Country: Japan
- Language: Japanese
- Box office: US$1,090,202

My Rainy Days (Japanese: 天使の恋, Hepburn: Tenshi no Koi; lit. 'Angel's Love') is a 2009 Japanese romantic drama film written and directed by Yuri Kanchiku in her directorial debut, based on the cell phone novel of the same name. Japanese model Nozomi Sasaki stars in her first lead role in a film, as a 17-year-old high school student. The film tells the story of a manipulative schoolgirl who mends her ways when she falls for an older professor.

My Rainy Days debuted in a special screening at the 22nd Tokyo International Film Festival. It was subsequently released in Japanese cinemas on 7 November 2009. The film received generally positive reviews from critics and grossed a total of US$1,090,202 in four different countries.

== Plot ==
Rio Ozawa is a beautiful and manipulative 17-year-old high school student who, along with her best friends Maki and Miho, engages in compensated dating and extortion to earn money. After defending her naïve classmate Tomoko from school bully Naoko, Rio invites Tomoko to join her clique and soon manipulates her into participating in their compensated dating scheme. It is revealed that Rio and Naoko are secretly lovers, and that Naoko assisted Rio in luring Tomoko into the clique.

One day, a photo developing store accidentally switches Rio's photographs with those of a man who also has the last name Ozawa. She arranges to meet Kouki Ozawa, an introverted 35-year-old history professor, to swap photos. As they are walking together, Kouki suddenly faints and is rushed to the hospital. The next day, Rio visits Kouki at the hospital, and they begin to bond. As Rio falls in love with Kouki, she asks him to tutor her, stops doing compensated dating, and ends her romantic relationship with Naoko.

When Rio scores 99 on her history test, Kouki agrees to take her on a date. While in a library one day, Kouki kisses Rio for the first time. Unbeknownst to Rio, Kouki underwent surgery for a brain tumor three years earlier, but the tumor was not completely removed. Kouki's cousin Kaori tries to convince him to reconsider another surgery, but he does not want to be a burden to others. To avoid hurting Rio, Kouki suddenly distances himself from her, leaving her heartbroken.

Naoko, who has been skipping school, walks into class unexpectedly and tries to stab Tomoko, accusing her of taking Rio away from her, but Rio shields Tomoko. Naoko then runs onto the school rooftop, with Rio in pursuit. Naoko tearfully tells Rio that she had been repeatedly raped by her mother's boyfriend and that her mother blamed her after he left her, so Naoko murdered him. Rio attempts to dissuade Naoko from jumping, but as Tomoko, Maki, and Miho arrive, Naoko jumps to her death after professing her love to Rio.

Distressed by Naoko's suicide, Rio confesses to Tomoko that she was the one who ordered Naoko to bully her, prompting Tomoko to sever ties with Rio. However, when Rio collapses from stress at school, they rekindle their friendship. After Rio laments to her friends that Kouki has moved out of his house without saying goodbye, they convince Kaori to visit Rio at the hospital. Sympathetic, Kaori reveals that Kouki has been transferred to another university and gives Rio his new address.

Rio meets with Kouki and reveals that three years earlier, she became pregnant as a result of rape, so her mother took her to the hospital to have an abortion. She then resorted to prostitution and extortion as a way to avoid getting hurt again, but after meeting Kouki, she realized that seeing a loved one get hurt was much more painful. Kouki acknowledges that Rio is no longer the same person. Shortly after Rio boards a bus, Kouki faints.

Rio accompanies Kouki to the hospital and learns of his brain tumor. When she visits him the next day, he tells her that he never expected to fall in love with a girl like her knowing how much time he had left to live, but since meeting her, he began wishing for more time with her. Rio urges Kouki to undergo another surgery, even at the risk of losing his memories. He reluctantly agrees, and shortly before the surgery, he finally tells Rio that he loves her.

Some time later, Rio graduates from high school. On a rainy day, she returns to the hospital to find Kouki, who survived the surgery. Though he does not seem to remember her, he agrees to walk her to the train station under his umbrella. After Kouki walks away, a tearful Rio stands in the rain. Shortly afterwards, Kouki returns and covers Rio under his umbrella, and she joyfully embraces him.

== Cast ==
- Nozomi Sasaki as Rio Ozawa
- Shosuke Tanihara as Kouki Ozawa
- Hikaru Yamamoto as Tomoko Ayukawa
- Mitsuki Oishi as Maki Tanuma
- Araki Nanaki as Miho Matsukata
- Motoki Fukami as Yuuji Tanabe
- Saki Kagami as Naoko Shibata
- Wakana Sakai as Kaori Ozawa
- Mitsuru Fukikoshi as Masao Shimoyama
- Mayumi Wakamura as Ayako Ozawa
- Kanji Tsuda as Kazuki Tashiro

== Production ==
The cell phone novel My Rainy Days, which revolves around the topic of female high school students, had 13 million readers in Japan as of July 2009. On 19 July 2009, it was announced to the media that the novel would have a film adaptation and that the main cast members would be popular model Nozomi Sasaki and professional actor Shosuke Tanihara. In her first lead role in a film, Sasaki was cast in the role of Rio, a 17-year-old high school student, while Tanihara would be her co-star, playing 35-year-old university professor Kouki. Tanihara had previously starred in films like Nodame Cantabile: The Movie (2009) and the film adaptation of the manga Love Com (2006). Filming was done at a university in Yokohama.

== Soundtrack ==
The music was composed by indigo blue and Zentaro Watanabe.

No.	Title	Writer(s)	Length
1.	"I'm the One (Prologue)"	indigo blue	3:03
2.	"Blue Souls"	indigo blue	1:23
3.	"I'm the One"	indigo blue	3:13
4.	"Humming Angel"	indigo blue	2:23
5.	"My Rainy Days"	Zentaro Watanabe	3:00
6.	"Gone Away"	indigo blue	2:03
7.	"Wish part2"	Zentaro Watanabe	1:54
8.	"Walking in the Sun"	indigo blue	1:14
9.	"Green Fields"	indigo blue	2:02
10.	"Popping Candy"	indigo blue	1:33
11.	"All I Feel"	indigo blue	1:19
12.	"Cold Wind"	indigo blue	2:38
13.	"Believe In"	Zentaro Watanabe	1:47
14.	"Innocent"	Zentaro Watanabe	2:09
15.	"Allure"	indigo blue	2:33
16.	"By the Sea"	indigo blue	2:29
17.	"She Doesn't Know"	indigo blue	1:46
18.	"Memories"	Zentaro Watanabe	3:36
19.	"Wish"	Zentaro Watanabe	4:47
20.	"Far Away"	Zentaro Watanabe	2:33
21.	"Waltz"	Love Psychedelico	3:50
22.	"Beautiful Days"	Love Psychedelico	3:35
23.	"Here I Am"	Love Psychedelico	3:32
24.	"Let It Go"	Yuna Ito	5:15

== Release ==
My Rainy Days premiered at the 22nd Tokyo International Film Festival on 17 October 2009. There, the film was showcased as one of the festival's special film screenings. It was subsequently released in Japanese cinemas on 7 November 2009. Some theaters banned the original film poster because it showed the lead actress bare-backed from the waist up. Another poster was released that showed both leads about to kiss.

The film made its first overseas screening in Singapore. There, it was released under the English title My Rainy Days on 8 April 2010 by distributor Cathay-keris Films. In Hong Kong, the film was released under its Chinese title of "出租天使" (pinyin:chūzū tiānshǐ) on 29 July 2010.

== Reception ==
=== Box office ===
Tenshi no Koi debuted at the 10th position in the Japanese box office on the weekend of 7–8 November 2009, grossing a total of $329,536. It remained in the Japanese box office for one more week, earning a total gross of $868,360 in Japan. Hong Kong garnered the highest overseas gross, with the film becoming the sixth highest grossing there during its debut week, earning 650,000 yuan. The film grossed a total of US$180,516 over the three weekends it was shown in Hong Kong. It also grossed a total of $36,410 and $2,598 in Singapore and Taiwan box offices, respectively. In total, it earned US$1,090,202 worldwide.

=== Critical response ===
The film received positive reviews, particularly for its photography and acting of the lead characters.

Maggie Lee of The Hollywood Reporter said that the film's "love relationship draws on the stuff of Korean TV soaps" but added that it "avoids conventional tearjerking pitfalls with some unexpected narrative turns." She also praised actress Nozomi Sasaki, saying that her acting value as brings "charismatic, slightly unreachable presence" to the film. She also praised the director's handling of the film, which she says showcases "pubescent sexuality and the mind-sets and mannerisms of the new generation without being patronizing or judgmental."
