= Nozomi =

Nozomi may refer to:

- Nozomi (given name)
- Nozomi (book), a photobook by Nozomi Sasaki
- Nozomi Entertainment, the anime license and distribution division of retailer The Right Stuf International
- Nozomi (spacecraft), a failed Mars space probe
- Nozomi (train), a high-speed train service in Japan
- Sony Xperia S, a Sony smartphone codenamed Nozomi

== See also ==
- Nozomi Witches, a manga series by Toshio Nobe
