= Metrico =

2014 video game

- Artwork for Metrico+, a 2016 re-release of Metrico.
- Developer: Digital Dreams
- Publisher: Digital Dreams
- Composer: Palmbomen
- Engine: Unity
- Platforms: PlayStation Vita; Microsoft Windows; PlayStation 4 Xbox One
- Release: PlayStation Vita: NA: 5 August 2014; EU: 6 August 2014; Windows, PS4, Xbox One: WW: 23 August 2016
- Genre: Puzzle-platform
- Mode: Single-player

Metrico is a puzzle-platform game developed and published by independent Dutch developer Digital Dreams for the PlayStation Vita. The music is by Dutch electronic music producer Palmbomen. The project was supported by the Dutch Game Garden, a studio incubation program. It was released in North America on 5 August 2014, and in Europe on 6 August 2014. Metrico was initially available for free for members of PlayStation Plus.

A re-release of the original game with additional content was released for Microsoft Windows, PlayStation 4, and Xbox One on 23 August 2016 entitled Metrico+.

== Gameplay ==
Metrico is a 3D-platform game, and levels often have simple colour-schemes. Typically, level backgrounds are a solid colour, and the midground may include visuals such as mountains, which are typically simple-toned prisms. Platforms are mostly simple-toned geometric shapes, such as cubes and 3D-rectangles.

== Reception ==
Reception

Aggregate scores
Aggregator	Score
GameRankings	70%
Metacritic	68/100

Review scores
Publication	Score
Eurogamer	8/10
GameSpot	6/10
IGN	6.5/10

Metrico received mixed reviews from critics. On aggregators GameRankings and Metacritic, it holds a score of 70% and 68 respectively. Colin Moriarty, reviewing for IGN, praised the game's "ingenious puzzles", but noted some technical issues and the game's use of "gimmicky, sometimes broken controls". Likewise, GameSpot's reviewer Josiah Renaudin criticized Metrico's "often unwieldy controls", but noted a "beautiful audiovisual blend" and "exciting sense of discovery".
