= Palmbomen =

Dutch electronic musical project

Palmbomen is the stage name of Amsterdam, Netherlands based musician Kai Hugo (born 1988). Palmbomen has released on NON Records, a label he helped found with his friend Bear Damen, and French label Kitsuné Maison. Palmbomen has also scored the soundtrack for the PlayStation Vita game Metrico as well as being featured on the soundtrack for Grand Theft Auto V. Since 2015, Hugo has been releasing house music under the moniker Palmbomen II.

== Beginnings ==
Hugo's first project for the label NON Records was entitled Ganz Nackisch. After a few songs, he decided to ditch the hard sound of this project for a more tropical one. Only being asked to fill in for a cancelled artist was the name Palmbomen chosen, which is the Dutch word for palm trees. The name was chosen “because of the absolute absence of palm trees in Holland, they represent somewhat of a small detail of utopia” notes Hugo.

== Moon Children and Kitsuné Maison ==
Kai recorded material using mostly antiquated equipment to capture a vintage sound for what would be his debut EP. Moon Children was released on NON Records in July 2010, with a release party Amsterdam nightclub Trouw. The live performance featured a custom built live light set which he programmed himself. After receiving positive reviews from Vice Magazine, The Examiner, and 3VOOR12, French music and fashion label Kitsuné Maison included the title track on their 10th Kitsune Maison Compilation, released in November 2010.

== Night Flight Europa ==
Following extensive touring of the live light set, Palmbomen relocated to Berlin to record a full-length record. Hugo further developed his analogue sound to incorporate more elements of ambient house, psychedelia, and Italo disco. The resulting album "Night Flight Europa" was released by NON Records in January 2013, and received positive reviews from The Fader, Red Bull Music Academy, and Decoder Magazine. The record also caught the attention of Belgian electronic music duo Soulwax, who invited Palmbomen to open for them at their annual Soulwaxmas celebration in 2012.

== Grand Theft Auto V, Metrico, and USA ==
Following an extensive tour in support of the new record, Palmbomen again was approached by Soulwax, but this time in regard to their involvement with the soundtrack for the Rockstar Games series Grand Theft Auto. Eventually it was revealed Soulwax had remixed Palmbomen's track 'Stock' for their station Soulwax FM in Grand Theft Auto V. This sparked a new connection to the video game industry, with Sony commissioning Palmbomen to create the soundtrack for their PlayStation Vita game Metrico, released in August 2014. Hugo left Berlin for Los Angeles in 2014, where he continues to score music for video games, movies, and records as Palmbomen.

== Palmbomen II ==
Since 2015, Hugo has been releasing under the moniker Palmbomen II. Hugo birthed Palmbomen II while spending a summer watching X-Files in his mother's attic in the Netherlands, and Palmbomen II marks a significant departure from his previous sound on Night Flight Europa. Explaining his moniker change, Hugo tells Dummy Mag: "I wanted to split Palmbomen in two. It's a practical thing. In Palmbomen, I play with a band, and playing live, you have to cheat. I remember trying to emulate the sound with a band playing – we had a gigantic setup, but it was impossible. I thought that if I'm gonna play with a band, I wanna do it with a band – no electronics, no click track, no bullshit. On the other hand, if I want to do electronics, I just want a bunch of drum machines and synthesizers to play around with."

He debuted his new moniker with the full-length self-titled album "Palmbomen II", an X-Files inspired Outsider House album in which each track is named after a minor X-Files character. The album was released via Beats In Space on March 3, 2015 and was well received by critics, with a 7.3 out of 10 from Pitchfork and 3.7 out of 5 from Resident Advisor. Approximately a year later, Palmbomen II released "Center Parcs EP", a dreamy IDM album cowritten with fellow Dutch producer Betonkust. Palmbomen II and Betonkust wrote the album over the course of a rainy weekend at the virtually abandoned holiday resort "Center Parcs De Eemhof", drawing inspiration from the shiny façade and inauthenticity of "swimming paradises". Center Parcs EP was released via the Vancouver-based label 1080p on February 26, 2016.
