= Reus (video game) =

2013 video game

- Logo
- Developer: Abbey Games
- Publisher: Abbey Games
- Designers: Adriaan Jansens; Dennis Pullens; Nick Witsel
- Programmers: Bas Zalmstra; Maarten Wiedenhof; Manuel Kerssemakers; Dennis Pullens; Tim de Jager; Jacco Krijnen
- Artists: Maarten Wiedenhof; Marlies Barends; Ronnie Dieleman; Rick Sorgdrager; Mitchell Tummers
- Composer: Joni van der Leeuw
- Engine: Microsoft XNA
- Platforms: Windows, Linux, macOS, PlayStation 4, Xbox One
- Release: Windows: WW: May 16, 2013; Linux, macOS: WW: January 7, 2014; PlayStation 4, Xbox One: NA: October 11, 2016; EU: October 14, 2016
- Genres: God game, simulator
- Mode: Single-player

Reus is an indie game produced by independent game studio Abbey Games. Reus is a god game in which the player controls giants who can modify the nature of the planet through terraforming, creating life, and altering genes. The game was released for Microsoft Windows on May 16, 2013.

A sequel, Reus 2, was released in 2024.

== Gameplay ==
Gameplay screenshot showing two giants in the background of the planet

Reus involves guiding four elemental giants who have the ability to shape the two-dimensional planet. The giants can provide resources on each "patch" of land, such as animals, plants, or minerals. The goal is to provide support to the planet's humans, who act on their own and cannot be directly controlled. The actions of the player can influence the humans' behavior; for example, providing humans with too many resources can cause them to be greedy and wage wars with each other.

== Development ==
Abbey Games was supported by the Dutch Game Garden, an EU funded studio incubation program. Reus (Dutch for "giant") was announced by Abbey Games in a blog post on their website on June 21, 2012. On January 14, 2013, Abbey Games released an in-game trailer on YouTube outlining the game and revealing gameplay. On April 16, 2013, Abbey Games released another video on YouTube, which revealed a release day of May 16, 2013, one month later. The game is available on Steam, Desura, GOG.com, and GamersGate. The game was made available to purchasers of the Humble Indie Bundle X who spent more than the average price.

== Reception ==
Reception

Aggregate score
Aggregator	Score
Metacritic	PC: 75/100; PS4: 75/100; XONE: 65/100

Review scores
Publication	Score
Destructoid	9/10
GameSpot	8.0/10
IGN	6.8/10

Reus received generally favorable reviews. GameSpot awarded the game with an 8.0 out of 10 score, citing that "Reus grows into a game that presents complex challenges, a great deal of flexibility, and the freedom to determine your own standards of success, or to simply enjoy experimenting with the landscape and toying with humans." IGN gave the game a lower score, awarding the game with a 6.8 out of 10. The game's art style was praised, but its repetitiveness along with its "needlessly complex and unintuitive system of synergies and transmutations" were cause for criticism. Destructoid praised Reus and gave it a score of 9 out of 10; while flaws were mentioned, the game was cited as being "a delight to play at every turn, and it strikes the perfect balance between providing new content and not overloading players."
