= Dutch Game Garden =

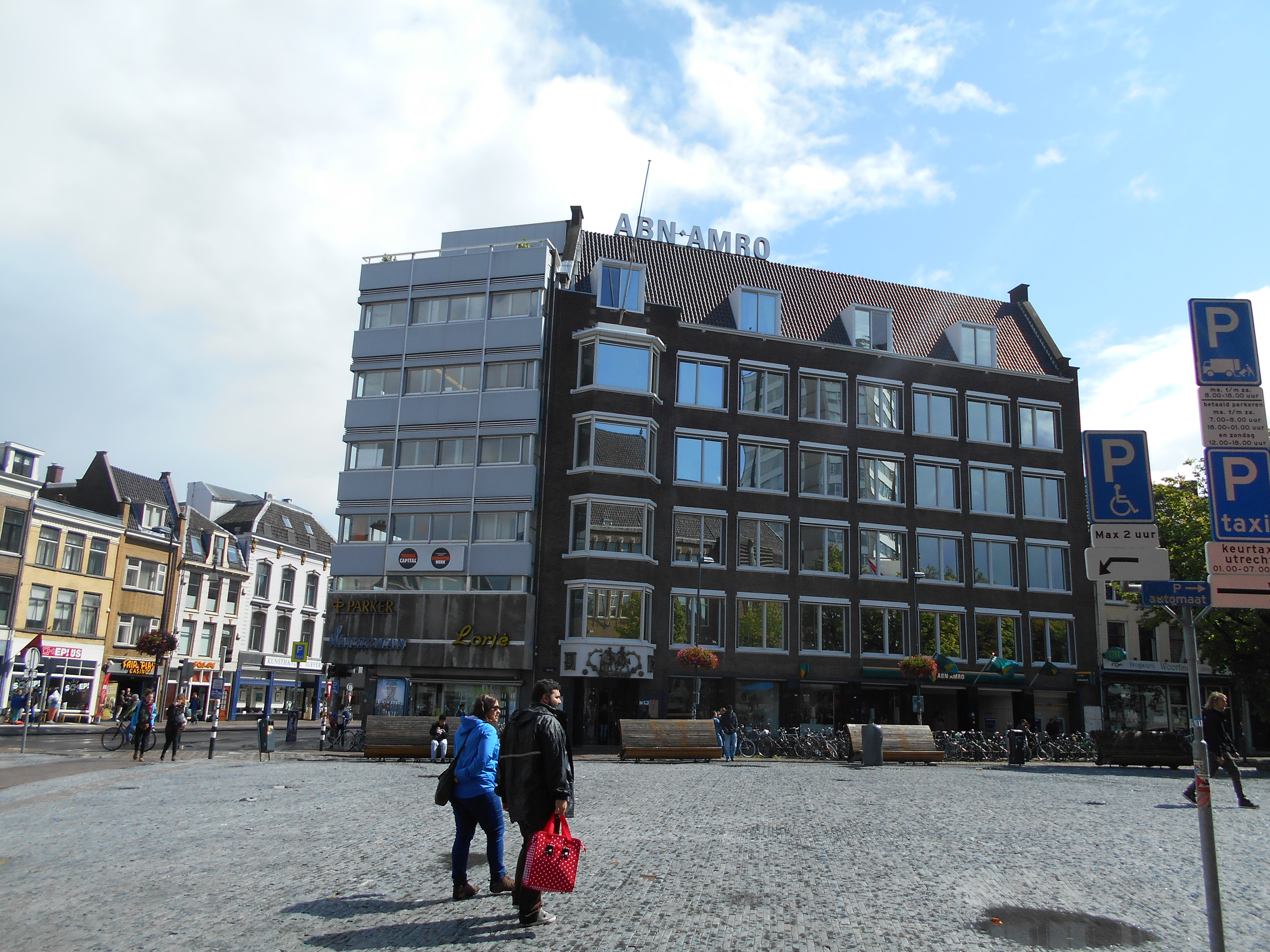
- The building on Neude square where the organisation was based from 2010 - 2020
- Type: Private foundation
- Industry: Video games
- Founded: June 19, 2008
- Defunct: January 1, 2025
- Fate: Closed amid funding issues
- Headquarters: Utrecht, Netherlands
- Website: dutchgamegarden.nl

The Dutch Game Garden was a video game studio incubator in Utrecht, The Netherlands. It was launched in 2008 using funding from the European Regional Development Fund, with the goal of investing in new Dutch studios. The organisation was the largest such program in the Netherlands, it incubated around 130 studios and housed around 150 over its lifetime. Changes to regional funding rules closed down the program in January 2025.

== History ==
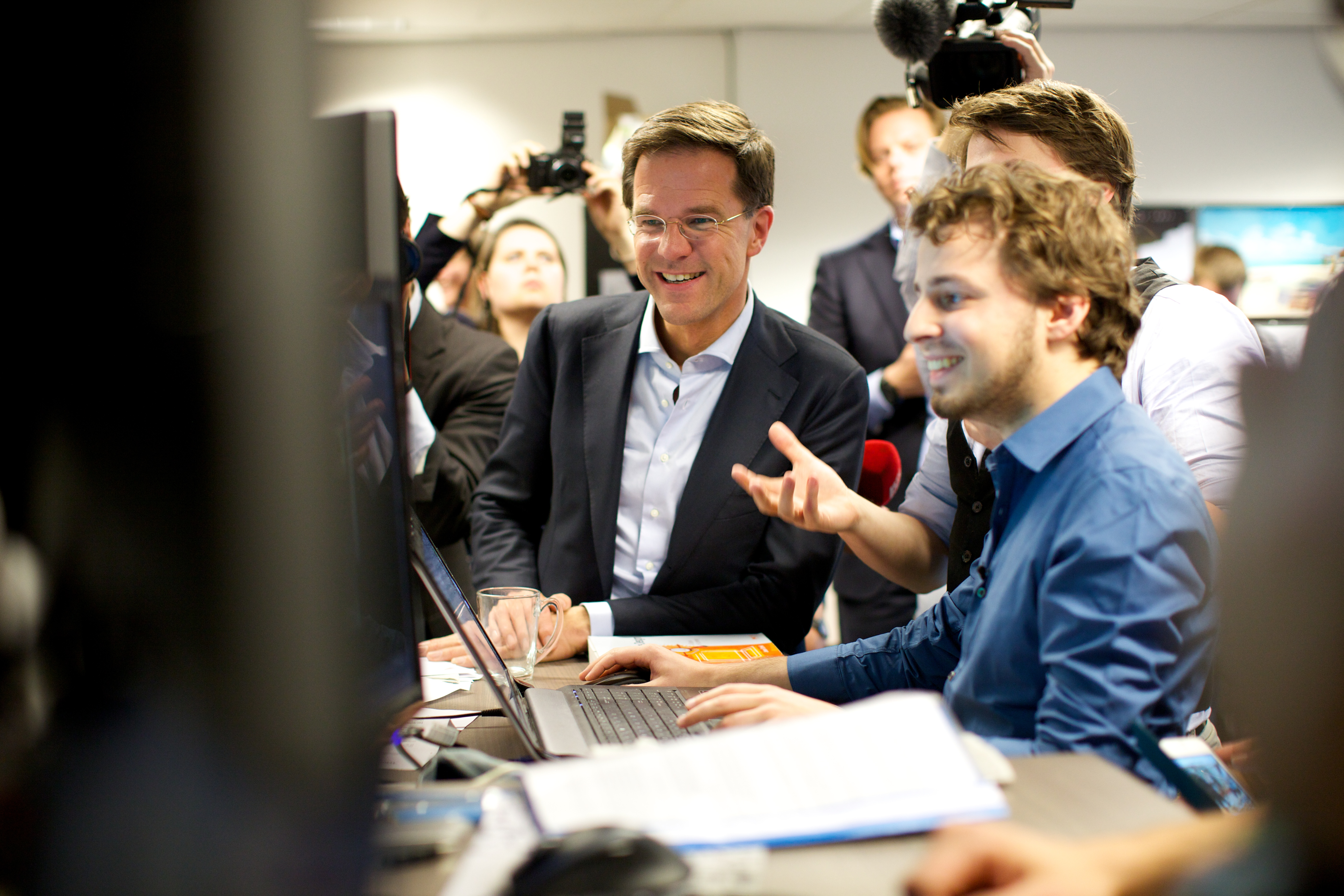
Mark Rutte visiting the Dutch Game Garden in 2014

The universities in Utrecht- Hogeschool voor de Kunsten Utrecht and Utrecht University had been offering courses in game development since 2002. The Utrecht city council and Dutch government recognised the potential for the rapidly growing video game sector in 2008, which at the time suffered from a lack of visibility in the Netherlands. The only major studio in the country at that time was Guerrilla Games, and so the Dutch Game Garden was conceived as a means to invest in new studios. Many studios at the Dutch Game Garden were established by graduates of local university game development programs.

in 2010, the program was relocated to the former ABN AMRO building on Neude square, which offered much more space than the initial venue. Some of the companies then working at the garden were considering moving out of the city in search of larger offices, so the move was intended to keep them present in Utrecht. By 2014 the program had resulted in the creation of 200 jobs and 6 million euros in revenue. The organisation relocated again in 2020, to Europalaan 400, in order to be close to technology start-ups in the Dotslash community.

In September 2024, it was announced that the Dutch Game Garden would close at the end of the year, as the province of Utrecht changed conditions associated with the subsidies that had funded it.

== Events ==
In 2010, the Dutch Game Garden introduced the INDIGO showcase, an interactive exhibition of the Dutch video games. It has become an annual event in the Netherlands, and showcases Dutch video games at the international events.

== Notable studios incubated ==
- Vlambeer - Ridiculous Fishing (2012)
- Abbey Games - Reus (2013)
- Ronimo Games - Awesomenauts (2013)
- Digital Dreams - Metrico (2014)
- Excamedia - European distributor for AntVR (2014)
- Active Cues - Tovertafel (2015)
- Wispfire - Herald: An Interactive Period Drama (2017)
- RageSquid - Descenders (2019)
