= Fudoh: The New Generation =

1996 film by Takashi Miike

- Japanese film poster
- Directed by: Takashi Miike
- Screenplay by: Toshiyuki Morioka
- Based on: Fudō by Hitoshi Tanimura
- Produced by: Yoshinori Chiba; Toshiki Kimura
- Starring: Shosuke Tanihara; Riki Takeuchi; Toru Minegishi; Kenji Takano
- Cinematography: Hideo Yamamoto
- Edited by: Yasushi Shimamura
- Music by: Chu Ishikawa
- Production companies: Gaga Communications; Excellent Film
- Distributed by: Taki Corporation
- Release date: October 12, 1996
- Running time: 99 minutes
- Country: Japan
- Language: Japanese
- Budget: ¥40 million / $268,000

Fudoh: The New Generation (極道戦国志 不動, Gokudō sengokushi: Fudō) is a 1996 Japanese film directed by Takashi Miike, based on an unfinished manga series by Hitoshi Tanimura. Two sequels followed, neither of which were directed by Miike.

== Plot ==
Riki Fudoh (Shosuke Tanihara) is a successful highschool student of Kyushu who leads a double life in organised crime. He commands a gang of underage assassins, which include children and teenagers armed with advanced weapons, and aspires to control the entire island's criminal underworld in order to get revenge against his own father, Iwao (Toru Minegishi). A member of the Nioh yakuza organization, Iwao was ordered to settle a dispute with the powerful Yasha-Gumi organization of Osaka by killing his oldest son, Riki's brother, whose murder Riki secretly witnessed and swore to avenge. Riki is mainly helped by his lieutenants, Aizone (Kenji Takano), an immensely strong brute; Touko (Tamaki Kenmochi), a gun-toting female student; and Mika (Miho Nomoto), a hermaphrodite student who works part-time as a stripper and wields a dartgun with her vagina. Together, they launch a campaign of gruesome assassinations against the top figures of the Kyushu underworld, with his father as the ultimate goal.

The Kyushu underworld goes into a state of panic due to the deaths and alerts Daigen Nohma (Riki Takeuchi), the legendary boss of the Yasha-Gumi, who in turns calls Riki's father. Suspecting his son, Iwao sends out Gon, a former South Korean Army agent, to infiltrate Riki's high school as the new gym teacher. He's not the only one with a secret, as Jun Minoru (Marie Jinno), a beautiful woman, arrives as well to the school to replace an English teacher previously killed by the gang. Riki meets her at his house and it becomes apparent she was the girlfriend of Riki's dead older brother. However, around this time a gang war explodes in the city. Gon unveils his intentions to kill Riki and defeats Mika and Touko by using martial arts moves and acid, causing the death of the latter. Enraged, Riki attacks him, learning in the process that Gon is actually his own half-brother. The battle goes sour and the boy nearly dies, but is saved when Jun arrives and shoots Gon.

Later that night, Iwao attacks Riki in the same manner Riki witnessed his brother being executed. However, Riki is prepared and kills his father, finally avenging his brother. At his father's funeral, Riki confronts the only enemy who managed to survive an assassination, Nohma. The two exchange words and Nohma pulls out a gun at the same time Riki unsheathes his katana. The film ends as the two are about to duel.

== Cast ==
- Shosuke Tanihara as Riki Fudoh
- Miho Nomoto as Mika
- Tamaki Kenmochi as Touko Zenzai
- Marie Jinno as Jun Minoru
- Shunji Takano as Akira Aizone
- Tōru Minegishi as Iwao Fudoh
- Riki Takeuchi as Daigen Nohma
- Satoshi Niizuma as Gon
- Takeshi Caesar as Kyushu Yakuza Leader
- Mickey Curtis as Yasha-Gumi Hitman

== Release ==
Fudoh: The Next Generation was initially going be intended as a V-Cinema release in Japan. While viewing the rushes of the film, the producers felt it was too good of a picture to be released straight-to-video and had it premiere in theaters instead. It was released theatrically in Japan on October 12, 1996.

Fudoh: The Next Generation was one of the first films directed by Takashi Miike to play to foreign audiences. The film was shown in early 1997 at the Brussels International Fantastic Film Festival in Belgium, followed by a release at the Fantasia Film Festival in Montreal and the Toronto International Film Festival.

== Reception ==
Time listed the film as one of the top films of the year in December 1997.

== Footnotes ==
=== References ===
- Mes, Tom (2006). Agitator: The Cinema of Takashi Miike. FAB Press. ISBN 1903254418.
