= Fit's =

Brand of chewing gum

Fit's is a Japanese brand of gum produced by Lotte Group introduced in 2010. It contains twelve units of gum in each pack (box). It contains sugar alcohols Maltitol, Mannitol, Erythritol and also Isomaltulose.

Fit's sold over 40 million in its first 5 months in the Japanese gum market where 4 million-per-year is considered large success. During this period, the product was marketed on TV with a series of commercials featuring Nozomi Sasaki.

== See also ==
- Trident (gum)
