= Anna Devor =

Biomedical engineer and academic

- Born: אנה דבור; 1972 (age 53–54)
- Education: Hebrew University of Jerusalem
- Scientific career
- Workplaces: Massachusetts General Hospital; University of California, San Diego; Boston University
- Thesis: Functional organization of the local network in the inferior olivary nucleus (2001)

Anna Devor (Hebrew: אנה דבור; born 1972) is an Israeli-American biomedical engineer who is a full professor at Boston University. Her research considers neuronal imaging and new strategies to better understand brain function. She is the editor of Neurophotonics, an SPIE journal. Also, Anna Devor has additional work with MGH/HST Martinos Center for Biomedical Imaging.

== Early life and education ==
Devor was an undergraduate student in Israel. She moved to the Hebrew University of Jerusalem for doctoral studies, where she studied biophysical mechanisms of membrane potential oscillations in a network of coupled neurons. After earning her doctorate, she moved to the Massachusetts General Hospital to work as a postdoc in brain imaging technology.

== Research and career ==
Devor launched her own research laboratory at University of California, San Diego in 2005, where she has worked on technologies that enable the real time detection of brain activity. She combines these measurements with system-level analysis and functional magnetic resonance imaging. She created a brain-computer interface that had a flexible backing with penetrating microneedles, which can interface with the human brain and record signals from nearby neurons.

Devor has developed summer schools based on neuroimaging, microscopy and blood flow regulation. Devor is the editor-in-chief of Neurophotonics, an SPIE journal.

== Awards and honors ==
- The BRAIN Initiative awardee
- International Society for Magnetic Resonance in Medicine Outstanding Teacher Award
- Elected Fellow of the American Institute for Medical and Biological Engineering

== Background and Work Experience ==
Boston University profile of background information: https://www.bu.edu/eng/profile/anna-devor-ph-d/

== Selected publications ==
- Anna Devor; Andrew K Dunn; Mark L Andermann; Istvan Ulbert; David A Boas; Anders M Dale (1 July 2003). "Coupling of total hemoglobin concentration, oxygenation, and neural activity in rat somatosensory cortex". Neuron. 39 (2): 353–359. doi:10.1016/s0896-6273(03)00403-3. ISSN 0896-6273. PMID 12873390. Wikidata Q48249109.
- Sava Sakadzić; Emmanuel Roussakis; Mohammad A Yaseen; et al. (8 August 2010). "Two-photon high-resolution measurement of partial pressure of oxygen in cerebral vasculature and tissue". Nature Methods. 7 (9): 755–759. doi:10.1038/nmeth.1490. ISSN 1548-7091. PMC 2932799. PMID 20693997. Wikidata Q30986871.
- Anna Devor; Peifang Tian; Nozomi Nishimura; et al. (1 April 2007). "Suppressed neuronal activity and concurrent arteriolar vasoconstriction may explain negative blood oxygenation level-dependent signal". The Journal of Neuroscience. 27 (16): 4452–4459. doi:10.1523/jneurosci.0134-07.2007. ISSN 0270-6474. PMC 2680207. PMID 17442830. Wikidata Q37187155.
