= Herald: An Interactive Period Drama =

2017 single-player adventure video game

Herald
- Game poster
- Developer: Wispfire
- Director: Bart Heijltjes
- Programmer: Remko Haagsma
- Artist: Aïda de Ridder
- Writer: Roy van der Schilden
- Composer: Bart Delissen
- Engine: Unity
- Platforms: Microsoft Windows macOS; Linux; PlayStation 4 Xbox 360; Xbox One
- Release: NA: February 22, 2017; EU: February 22, 2017
- Genres: Adventure, Period Drama
- Mode: Single-player

Herald is a single-player adventure video game, or "interactive period drama", for Microsoft Windows, macOS, and Linux. It was the first game released by Wispfire, a Dutch indie studio located in the Dutch Game Garden, Utrecht. The company was founded by creative director Bart Heijltjes, writer Roy van der Schilden, artist Aïda de Ridder, and programmer Remko Haagsma. On March 31, 2017, Wispfire released a Patch that allows Herald to be played with Xbox 360, Xbox One and PlayStation 4 analog stick controllers.

As a mix between an adventure game and a visual novel, Herald is a choice-driven adventure game with a branching narrative, where the player can choose how the main protagonist, Devan Rensburg, behaves and interacts with other characters, thus affecting the storyline.

Herald is episodic, with Books I and II being released on February 22, 2017, for Steam, GOG, Humble, and itch.io Stores. After years of hiatus, Wispfire released Book III and IV in a bundle with the first two books on May 1, 2025.

On February 6, 2015, while still in development, Herald won the "Indie Prize Showcase for Best Narrative" and was nominated for "Best Art" at Casual Connect, Amsterdam.

Due to its theme on colonialism and other social and political issues, VALUE, a research group that studies the intersections of archaeology and video games, includes a chapter written by Roy van der Schilden and Bart Heijltjes about Herald and how Wispfire used history to create the game in their original book The Interactive Past.

== Plot ==
Set in an alternative 19th century, the West is united as a single colonial superpower, the British Protectorate, though it is struggling to maintain order on its Indian Eastern colonies. Now 1857, the growing inequality and prejudice creates tension between them, and the signs of rebellion are beginning to show. The story revolves around Devan Rensburg, a man of mixed heritage who became a steward on board of the HLV Herald, a merchant ship set for his country of birth.

After being saved from drowning at sea, Devan Rensburg tells his story to The Rani, a woman who has acquired his journal and wishes to know about his time aboard the HLV Herald. Devan explains how he stumbled upon a recruiter in the Capital harbor, Aaron Ludlow, who took a liking to Devan and granted him a position aboard the Herald. The Herald was tasked to take an influential politician, Louis Morton and his niece, Tabatha Veazie, to the Eastern Colonies. As Devan performs his duties as the ship's steward, he handles the racial tensions among the crew and guests on the ship due to the colonial unrest and uncovers its dark secrets.

== Characters ==
- Devan Rensburg (Vivek Bhurtun) - The main character and steward of the HLV Herald. Born from a Protectoratian man and a woman from the colonies, Devan was adopted by a Protectorate merchant family when he was young, leaving him with little memories of his biological parents or home country. Conflicted about his mixed heritage, 23-year-old Devan wishes to find more about Eastern roots and boards the Herald for his country of birth.
- Aaron Ludlow/Ashna (Troy Rodger) - Intelligent and hard-working, Aaron is employed as the second officer aboard the Herald in service of the merchant navy. Aaron was the one who recruited Devan to the Herald and become his first friend, though Aaron's motives often confuses Devan. Like Devan, Aaron is Indian and is a passionate advocate of equality, leading him to perform small forms of rebellion or mischief. At the end of Book II, it was reveals that Aaron is a woman and her real name is "Ashna", the daughter of The Rani, who is keeping Devan in her residence.
- Lady Tabatha Veazie (Marta da Silva) - A bright and strong-willed young woman, Tabatha is one of the most prestigious passengers on the Herald, who traveling to meet her father, Jonathan Faerwald Veazie, who is the regent of the Eastern colonies. Tabatha is a graduate from the only women's university in Britain, but her adventurous and progressive nature often clashes with her strict and traditional uncle, Louis Morton. Unlike her uncle, Tabatha is kind and friendly to those of lower stations and befriends Devan during their voyage on the Herald.
- Cornelis Hendriksz (Bas Sligting) - The captain of the HLV Herald, who is a bit intrusive as he demands to know everything that's going on his ship and willing to dealing out physical punishment if his rules are broken, but can be reasonable and fair.
- The Rani (Neela Bhurtun) - A mysterious woman who save Deven from his ill-fated voyage and asks him to recount his journey to her. She greatly dislikes the Protectorate control over her home and how they are exerting their influence on the Eastern colonies. "Rani" means "Queen" in Hindi, which refers to her status as the wife of the deceased Raja of Mishra, Abhay II.
- Louis Morton (Connor Mickinley) - Tabatha's snooty, pompous, and often cold-hearted uncle, an esteemed senator and one of the most prestigious passengers on the Herald. Morton comes from a family of doctors and once had a wife named Eleanor (Tabatha's aunt and Jonathan Veazie's sister), who died some time ago and is described to have a similar personality to Tabatha.
- Rupert Brunswick (Bill Dick) - First officer and navigator of the Herald, who has been sailor since he was young and is well-respected by the other crew members. He and Ian Douglas's mother are old friends and has taken Ian under his wing, which allows Brunswick to develop a rather overbearing interest towards the young boy.
- Ian Douglas (Yuri Theuns) - A young, precocious, and arrogant cabin boy abroad the Herald, although not entirely of his own accordance as his mother, Mary, push him to become a sailor. Although he is Brunswick's pupil, he is greatly disturbed by his superior's odd behavior and attention towards him.
- Caleb Haywood (Gideon Da Silva) - A boatswain on the Herald that hails from the American-Protectorate territories. Caleb has a brash, rude, and confrontational personality, which puts him at odds with the other crew members.
- Undra Aubertain (Mandela Wee Wee) - The Jamaican head chef on the Herald, who is typically easy-going yet headstrong, and is one that helps Devan learns his duties as a steward.
- Daniel Barros (Creso Filho) - A kind and friendly Brazilian member of the Herald who helps the Chef Aubertain in the kitchen. Daniel comes from a wealthy family but has cut ties with them and ran away after angering them for falling in love with Charlize, a black slave girl working on his father's estate.
- Robert Stoxan (Jim Sterling) - A somewhat odd, superstitious, and skittish passenger on the Herald, who also is working on the Herald to pay the rest of his travel fees to the Eastern colonies.
- Nikolaus Gehrig (Christian Kippelt) - The ship's dutiful and reliable doctor, who ironically suffers from seasickness and is constantly ill unless he take his medical tonics.
- Elisa Barros (Marta da Silva) - Elisa is the young daughter of Daniel Barros and his deceased slave lover, Charlize.

== Development ==
The Wispfire company creators began developing the concept for Herald after playing Beyond Good & Evil one night and discussed the game's "political story about censorship and free speech." After attending a "Game Over Hate" conference and talking to many other activists, they decided to create a game that "took on the subjects of identity and racial representation," believing it was time that games started taking these subjects seriously." The four founders of Wispfire chose to explore minority issues in the story, using Devan Rensburg's mixed race to tackle the issues of being "part of a minority and what it's like to be excluded." Before joining Dutch Game Garden and getting funding for their game in 2013, Wispfire spent many months on making a prototype of Herald in an attic to "create something more than just entertainment, a story that might tread on people's toes and start a discussion." Since joining Dutch Garden, Wispfire staff grew with the membership of Nick Witsel (Marketing and Assistant Narrative Design), Anna Mattaar (Assistant Writing and Editing), Tim White (Assistant UK Editor), Hans Cronau (Graphics Programmer), José Koppes (Lead 3D Animator), and Bart Delissen (Composer).

In late 2014, Wispfire officially announced Herald to the public and released their first trailer. Starting in early April 2015, development of the game was funded by a successful Kickstarter campaign and with the support of the Dutch Stichting Democratie en Media to add voice acting. To provide authenticity to the performance, Wispfire wanted voice actors with similar cultural heritage to the characters, such as Vivek Bhurtun, who voices protagonist Devan Rensburg. Being of Indian descent and raised in the United Kingdom, Bhurtun empathizes with Devan's struggle of being part of two cultures and this helped him in recording Devan's lines. In creating Devan's character, Roy van der Schilden did research on "historical men and women of mixed heritage, as well as on the world they lived in," using historical figures like Dido Elizabeth Belle and Frederick Douglass. He also read books such as Multatuli's Max Havelaar and Chinua Achebe's Things Fall Apart for inspiration for the colonial setting of Herald, mostly based on 19th century Britain and 17th century Dutch. Wispfire found the 19th century since it was "era which greatly influenced society through mass migration of cultures, laying the groundwork for the multicultural society we live in today, but also resulting in many conflicts which still bother us", as well as the cultural imperialism of the time. Roy van der Schilden also interviewed marginalized people in Netherlands society that experience "fear of exclusion and the necessity to adapt to a culture to truly fit in, such as a refugee from Iraq being persecuted for his sexuality."

In interviews with Gamasutra and Polygon, Wispfire reveals that they drew influence from Telltale's The Walking Dead for its character driven dialogue choices and TV series like Downton Abbey for its style, as well gathering people's thoughts on equality, colonialism, and multiple perspectives on cultural background, race, sexuality and gender that has "profound aspects of one's development". The staff states that the HLV Herald ship and characters on board serves as a "metaphor for the multicultural society".

When developing the graphics, Wispfire choose to use the Live2D program, as they lack the resources to do everything in 3D, to animate the characters portraits to convey their emotions with their facial expressions, inspired by the 2D portraits use in Japanese visual novels.

On March 31, 2017, Wispfire released a Patch that allows Herald to be played with dual analog stick game controllers. The Patch also includes bugfixes, changes and rewritten versions of various dialogue choice texts and help notes, and a new music theme for Daniel Barros.

During an interview at the E3, Wispfire's Roy van der Schilden states that Book III and IV will be released sometime in 2018. After years of delay, Wispfire announced Book III and IV will be released 2023, partnering with 2Awesome Studio. It finally released on May 1, 2025.

== Reception ==
Herald received mostly positive to moderate reviews, being praise for its plot, themes, voice acting, 2D art, and diverse characters. However, its 3D graphics, story pacing, and narrative branch gameplay are met with criticism. Even when it was still in development, the game receives positive feedback for their demo version, such as PopMatters praising Herald for its graphics and its gameplay for capturing the "mood with breadth rather than striving for particularities, and ultimately it is better for doing so." Aggregating review website Metacritic calculated an average score of 77 out of 100 based on 7 reviews, indicating "generally favorable reviews".

Within the Dutch community, Herald receives positive reception, Gamekings and GameCensor both gave Herald a positive reviews. The Dutch branch of IGN giving the game a rating of 9 and saying that "Rarely do form, content and gameplay combine so effectively to make such a complete artwork as Herald." Italian video game magazine The Games Machine rated Herald with a score of 80, saying "Herald: An Interactive Period Drama lives up to its name: it's an exciting adventure on the sea, with a lot of meaningful choices and a compelling story." Independent French blog Graal awards Herald with a 5/5 star rating.

The Guardian rated Herald with a 4/5 score, comparing some elements of the game to Akira Kurosawa's Rashomon. End World Gaming rated Herald with a 95/100 score, praising the storyline of Book I and II. HighEnd Gamer rated the game with a 4.5/5 for its "brilliant twisting story that is expertly delivered", voice acting, "engrossing and believable" world, and characters. Player2Reviews rates Herald with an 8.5/10, praising its themes, cast, and 2D graphics, but dislikes the 3D models.

Polygon gave a positive review for Herald, calling the first two books "novel-like in its sensibilities and in its literary quality" and "offers cool-headed insights into another way of living, and into the way we live today. It's engaging, and it has something vital to say." Kill Screen praises it take on the theme of identity, saying "Herald reminds us that—no matter where you say you're from—we're all part of a larger story that's much more complicated." UK website Invision Community scores Herald 7/10 and considers it " a powerful voyage into racism, sexism and any other social division that was all the rage at the turn of the 19th century," though acknowledges "Herald won't be everybody's cup of grog" due to its "inconsistent narrative and lack of visual variety". The Nerdx's Holly Swainyard plays the game at the EGX Rezzard 2017 trade fair and compliments Herald for being a "beautifully made and designed period adventure."
