= Swords & Soldiers =

2009 real-time strategy video game

- Developers: Ronimo Games (PC, Mac, Wii, PS3); Two Tribes (Wii U, iOS)
- Publisher: Ronimo Games (Note: Original iOS version published by Chillingo. New iOS version published by GameClub. Wii U and Switch version published by Two Tribes.)
- Series: Swords & Soldiers
- Platforms: Microsoft Windows, Mac OS X, Linux, Android, Wii, PlayStation 3, iOS, Nintendo 3DS, Wii U, Nintendo Switch
- Release: EU: May 15, 2009; NA: June 8, 2009
- Genre: Real-time strategy
- Modes: Single-player, multiplayer

Swords & Soldiers is a 2009 real-time strategy video game developed and published by Ronimo Games. It was released in Europe on May 15, 2009, and in North America on June 8. It is available for Windows, Mac OS X, Linux, Android, Wii, PlayStation 3, iOS, Nintendo 3DS, Wii U, and Nintendo Switch. Two Tribes released Swords & Soldiers on the Wii U eShop, which was released in North America and Europe on May 22, 2014.

A sequel, Swords & Soldiers II, was released on the Wii U eShop in May 2015. In June 2018, Ronimo Games started a Kickstarter project for a re-release, titled Swords & Soldiers II: Shawarmageddon.

== Gameplay ==
In Swords & Soldiers, three factions (the Vikings, the Aztecs and the Imperial Chinese) are fighting each other to gain the powers of the gods. The game boasts both a single player campaign for all three factions and a skirmish mode, as well as competitive split-screen multiplayer and several other modes and minigames players can unlock by progressing through the game.

The single player campaign features 10 missions for each faction, with objectives ranging from conquering the enemy's base on the other side of the play area to surviving a full out assault from the enemy or infiltrating their defenses with a limited number of troops. Players collect gold and mana which are used to purchase units and spells. After being built, units automatically begin marching towards the enemies base and players cast spells to either strengthen their own units or directly attack their enemies. Players must make strategic decisions on what units to build and when to send them out.

== Development ==
Swords & Soldiers began development after THQ acquired the rights to its first game de Blob. While it was originally intended to be a flash game, the developers saw potential in the title and moved it to the WiiWare service. The development team was initially made up by seven developers and a "varying amount of interns", and the team used the offices of Dutch Game Garden to develop the game. Swords & Soldiers began as simply a split-screen multiplayer game featuring only the Aztecs and the Vikings. The developers validated this decision using arguments such as them not being sure how well WiiWare games sell, that the project was mostly to show that they could develop a game from point A to point Z, that the multiplayer component was one of the strongest features of the game, and that beginning with multiplayer allows the developers to balance the game right away. The single player mode was added after the developers implemented a single player tutorial, which they found fun. While they intended to only put a small amount of single player content, they ended up adding 30 campaign levels, additional challenge modes, achievements, and other features. They used extensive play testing to ensure that the game, especially the single player mode, had a proper difficulty curve and that the gameplay is not complicated. They attempted to utilize it to test the game's balance, but found that testers took too long with strategies to use it accurately with testing factions' strengths. The developers cited the play testers for helping them make it as good as it is and for creating a fan following on the Internet. Several features of the game were implemented late in the development process, including the ability to change the game's pace. A major addition was added balance, which they realized was necessary after discovering that the balance was very poor in spite of believing it to be much better initially.

The developers were focused on the idea they had for the game from the beginning. The visual style and gameplay were established early in the development, motivating the developers in how simply the development process progressed. In the first months of its development, the developers had created a tool chain and approximately 90% of the gameplay functionality. Two features of the game were unclear to the developers during development; a "troop manipulation" mechanic, a common feature found in other real-time strategy video games that allows players to control the movements of their units, was a feature that the developers wanted to include. They attempted to include it by allowing players to drag units backwards or stop them by clicking on them, but felt that such a feature took away from tactical decisions and put too much emphasis on micromanagement and twitch gameplay. The developers added menus to the main gameplay late in the game. The final version was described by them as a "very polished version" of the vision they had of what they wanted.

The audio of Swords & Soldiers was created as a collaboration between the developers and an external audio studio called Sonic Picnic, which was located near their offices, making it very accessible to them. The developers found Sonic Picnic to be helpful, receiving an audio experience from them that matched with their vision. Due to a low budget, the developers offered Sonic Picnic royalties, which Sonic Picnic accepted due to being impressed by the prototype. Developers stated that this process kept them motivated to finish the game. The voice samples for the characters and units were created by recording the various developers and putting their voices in the game.

The developers cited the real-time strategy game StarCraft as a strong inspiration, citing in particular its use of factions as something that made it particularly more inspiring than other games in the genre. They add that the quality of StarCraft's factions comes from both the gameplay and their visual appearances. This caused them to focus on having three different factions that played differently from each other. They intended to make sure that every unit and spell was unique as well as different abilities for each faction such as how each one collects mana. The first faction, the Vikings, simply have to buy an upgrade, intending to make the Vikings the most accessible class. The Aztecs sacrifice a unit to turn its health into mana, which the developers state they did so to add "playful cruelty" to this faction. The Chinese faction has to build a Buddha statue, which generates mana until it is destroyed, requiring players to protect it. The developers intended to make the Chinese faction more complex than the other two. They intended on making each faction's miners different in how they collect gold, but found that this was too difficult to balance. The Chinese faction was originally not included in the game. The developers originally only revealed two factions - the Vikings and the Aztecs. On April Fools' Day, 2009, Ronimo jokingly announced that the yet to be revealed faction would be the Space Marines, but on April 22 the third faction was confirmed to be the Chinese Empire.

The developers' marketing plan began as merely releasing screenshots and videos of the game on the Internet, but they found that this was not adequate to create buzz. Because the deadline was pushed back a half of a year, the marketing started with the original release date in mind, the developers had to fill in the space between its announcement and release with enough marketing material to maintain interest in it. They had to get a full-time artist to create videos, screenshots, logos, and high resolution materials to release, also receiving assistance from Nintendo to promote the game. According to Ronimo's Joost van Dongen, the art style for Swords & Soldiers was inspired by the credits of a video called Super Moine (i.e. "Super Monk" in French), and from the ability of an artist in the team.

The PC version was renamed Swords & Soldiers HD and made available on Steam. The iOS version was originally not 64-bit and not compatible with iOS 11 and up. Apple has policy of removing all non-64-bit apps from their store. S&S iOS was developed by a third party company that has since gone bankrupt. According to a company representative, Ronimo Games never owned the source code, and therefore had no plans to release an update that will run on current Apple mobile devices. A 64-bit version of S&S iOS was released by GameClub on June 26, 2020, including enhancements from the Nintendo Switch version of the game.

== Reception ==
Reception

Aggregate score
Aggregator	Score
Metacritic	WII: 84/100; PS3: 81/100 iOS: 81/100; WIIU: 78/100

Review scores
Publication	Score
Edge	8/10
Eurogamer	8/10
GameSpot	8.0/10
IGN	8.7/10
Official Nintendo Magazine	91%
TouchArcade	iOS: 4/5

Swords and Soldiers has received a positive reception from critics, garnering a score of 84/100 at Metacritic. IGN gave the game its Editor's Choice award, calling it "one of the best console real-time strategy games ever" while praising the production values and personality of the game, as well as its unique approach to the genre. Nintendo Life called the game an essential download, praising the visuals, music and depth of the gameplay and noting the plethora of modes for players. Edge called it "a riot of colour and imagination" that "towers above everything else WiiWare currently has to offer". Official Nintendo Magazine called it "a colourful, vibrant and frankly brilliant console strategy title".

== Sequel ==
A sequel, Swords & Soldiers II, was released in May 2015. It features the Vikings versus two new factions, one of which is about demons. Players are able to control the location of their base and tell units where to move.
