= The Last Cop (2015 TV series) =

- Genre: Drama
- Written by: Tomoharu Satō
- Directed by: Ryūichi Inomata; Hiroto Akashi; Makoto Naganuma
- Starring: Toshiaki Karasawa; Masataka Kubota; Nozomi Sasaki
- Country of origin: Japan
- Original language: Japanese

Production
- Producers: Kazuya Toda; Hiroyuki Ueno; Hiroshi Itō

Original release
- Network: Nippon TV
- Release: 19 June 2015

The Last Cop (Japanese: ラストコップ, Rasutokoppu) is a Japanese television drama series based on the 2010 German television series Der letzte Bulle. The Japanese version was developed by Nippon TV and Hulu Japan. The first episode premiered on NTV on 19 June 2015. It received a viewership rating of 12.9%. The rest of six episodes are streaming on Hulu Japan.

Toshiaki Karasawa played the lead role of the detective Kōsuke Kyōgoku who was in coma for 30 years, and Nozomi Sasaki played his daughter. Yuki Saito, who sang a hit song in the 1980s, also appeared as a guest role.

In September 2016, the omnibus edition The Last Cop: episode 0 premiered with three episodes. A new television series was scheduled to air in October 2016.

== Cast ==
- Toshiaki Karasawa as Kōsuke Kyōgoku, a detective awakened from 30 years coma
- Masataka Kubota as Ryōta Mochizuki, a young detective and Kyōgoku's partner
- Nozomi Sasaki as Yui Suzuki, Kyōgoku's daughter
- Ichirōta Miyakawa as Makoto Suzuki, a detective married Kyōgoku's ex-wife
- Emi Wakui as Kanako Suzuki, Kyōgoku's ex-wife
- Shirō Sano as Yūji Endō, a chief of police
- Yuki Saito as herself (guest appearance)
- Funassyi (guest appearance)
