= Truth or Doubt =

Japanese quiz television game show

Truth or Doubt or Coming Doubt (カミングダウト, Kamingu Dauto) is a Japanese quiz television game show that aired on Nippon Television Network. It debuted on 3 April 2004, and last aired on 29 March 2005.

Shosuke Tanihara is the presenter of this programme. Every time, there are four or five celebrities as game players. The players tell their own stories which are true, but sometimes there would be made-up stories. There are two types of game cards; one is blue-coloured "TRUE CARD (トゥルーカード)" and the other is red-coloured "DOUBT CARD (ダウトカード)." When the players tell true stories, they use "TRUE CARDs," and when they are not true, players use "DOUBT CARDs." For each confession, other players guess that the story is true or made-up. If they think the story is not true, they point out, and it is truly false, he/she can reduce one card, but if the player wrongly point out, the card will be added as the penalty. Finally, when the player can eliminate all the cards, he/she will be the winner. The player who is good at conversation tactics usually wins the game. The programme's name is a Wasei-eigo pun on "coming out (カミングアウト)," in the sense of revealing secrets.

== Problems ==
Revealers sometimes tell crime-like stories. When those stories are true, other players get greatly surprised. If it is genuine crime, TV watchers also get astonished, and the statements can become social problems as celebrities' scandals.

== See also ==
- Japanese television programs
