= Shōsuke Tanihara =

Japanese actor (born 1972)

- 谷原 章介
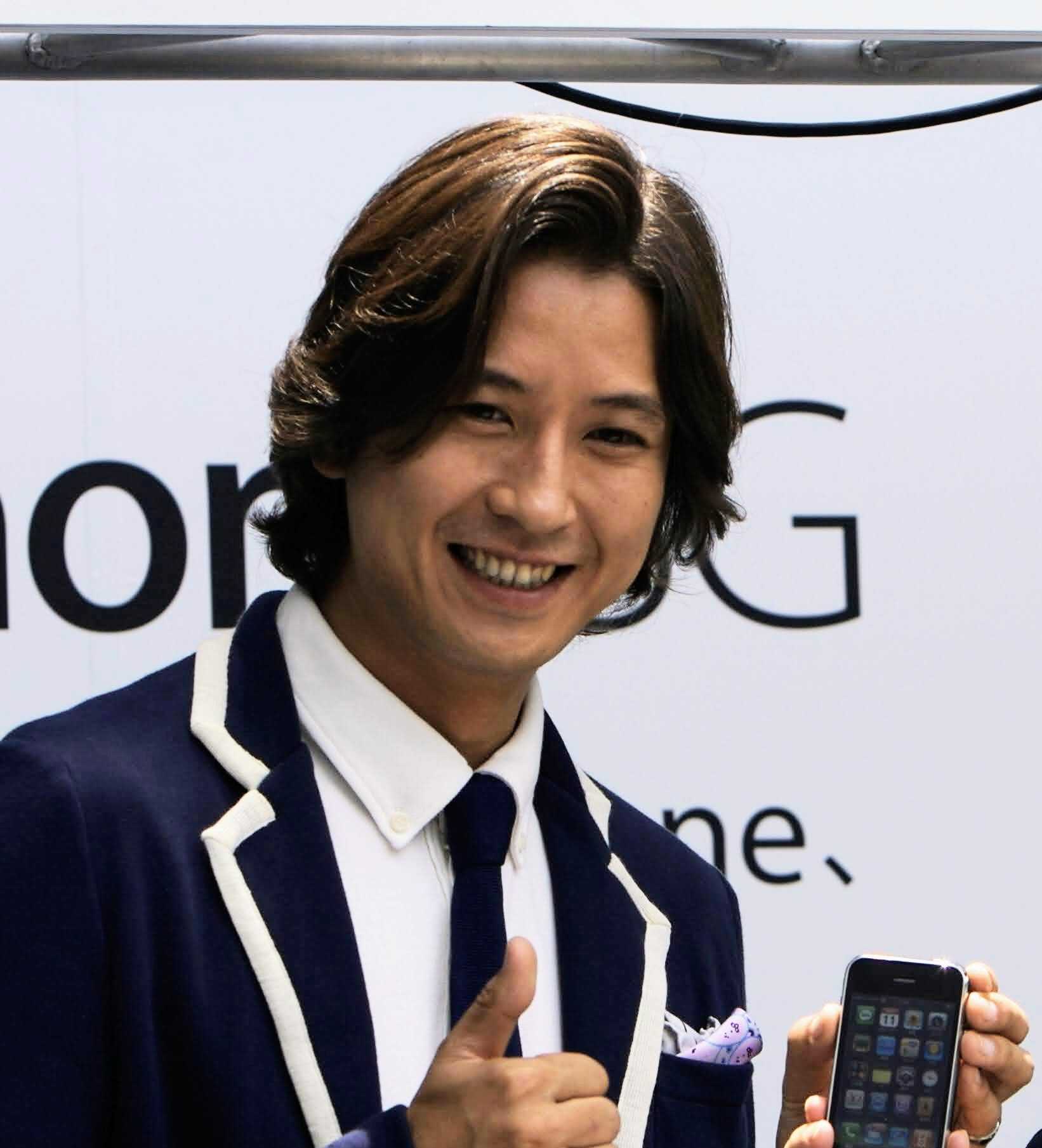
- Shōsuke Tanihara promotes iPhone 3G in 2008
- Born: July 8, 1972 (age 54); Yokohama, Kanagawa, Japan
- Occupation: Actor
- Years active: 1992–present
- Spouse: Emi Miyake (m. 2007)
- Children: 6

Shōsuke Tanihara (谷原 章介, Tanihara Shōsuke; born July 8, 1972) is a Japanese actor probably best known outside Japan for his portrayal of Riki Fudoh in Fudoh: The New Generation and Hajime Kudo in Godzilla vs. Megaguirus.

Tanihara hosts Tokyo Twenty-Four Living Supported by FLET'S Hikari, a podcast produced by TOKYO FM. The podcast began airing on January 7, 2006, with a guest appearance by the former Yokohama Bay Stars pitcher Takashi Saitō. He made the announcement at the 8th Best Formalist Award ceremony.

== Personal life ==
Shōsuke Tanihara was born in Yokohama, Kanagawa Prefecture, on July 8, 1972. He married Emi Miyake in 2015; they have six children together, three sons and three daughters.

== Filmography ==
=== Films ===
- Hana Yori Dango (1995)
- Fudoh: The New Generation (1996)
- Godzilla vs. Megaguirus (2000)
- Pyrokinesis (2000)
- Sky High (2003)
- Godzilla: Final Wars (2004)
- Lovely Complex (2006)
- Memories of Matsuko (2006)
- Vexille (2007)
- The Magic Hour (2008)
- The Handsome Suit (2008)
- My Rainy Days (2009)
- Baby Baby Baby! (2009)
- Victini and the Black Hero: Zekrom and Victini and the White Hero: Reshiram (2011)
- Andalusia: Revenge of the Goddess (2011)
- Dokidoki! PreCure the Movie: Mana's Getting Married!!? The Dress of Hope Tied to the Future! (2013), Marsh/Maro (voice)
- Birthday Card (2016), Himself
- Marmalade Boy (2018)
- Iwane: Sword of Serenity (2019)

=== Television dramas ===
- Boku no Ikiru Michi (2003)
- Shinsengumi! (2004), Itō Kashitarō
- Ōoku (2005), Tokugawa Tsunayoshi
- Gokusen 2 (2005), Takuma Kujo, teacher at Momo Girls High School
- Fūrin Kazan (2007), Imagawa Yoshimoto
- Watashitachi no Kyoukasho (2007)
- Mop Girl (2007) - Shotaro Ohtomo
- Love Shuffle (2009) - Kikuta Masato
- Ryōmaden (2010), Katsura Kogorō
- Gunshi Kanbei (2014), Takenaka Hanbei
- Smoking Gun (2014)
- Daddy Detective (2015), Shintaro Sugiyama
- Half Blue Sky (2018)
- Godaime San'yūtei Enraku (2019), San'yūtei Enraku V
- Fujoshi, Ukkari Gay ni Kokuru (2019) - Makoto
- Ōoku the Final (2019), Manabe Akifusa
- Awaiting Kirin (2020), Mitsubuchi Fujihide
- Nakamura Nakazo: Shusse no Kizahashi (2021)
- Brothers in Arms (2026), Hōjō Ujimasa

=== Variety shows ===
- Truth or Doubt (2004-2005, Host, TV Quiz Show)
- Panel Quiz Attack 25 (Next) (2015–present-, main presenter)

=== Video games ===
- Judge Eyes - Mitsuru Kuroiwa

=== Dubbing ===
- Mary Poppins Returns, Michael Banks (Ben Whishaw)
