= Nozomi (book) =

Japanese model Nozomi Sasaki's first photobook

- Author: Takeo Dec.
- Language: Japanese
- Publication date: August 1, 2008
- Media type: Photobook
- Pages: 96 pp

Nozomi, officially stylized as nozomi, is the first photobook by Japanese model Nozomi Sasaki, released in late 2008 by Shueisha.

It consists of photographs of Sasaki taken in Hawaii, Tokyo, and several other places. It also contains her swimsuit photos, without-makeup photos, and several interviews with her.

In its release year of 2008, three commemorative events were held in Tokyo, Osaka, and Sasaki's home city, Akita.

On July 24, 2009, Nozomi Sasaki's first DVD, also titled Nozomi, was released. This DVD documents the making of the photobook.
