= Neurophotonics =

- Discipline: Photonics, neuroscience and neuroimaging
- Language: English
- Edited by: Anna Devor

Publication details
- History: 2014-present
- Publisher: SPIE
- Frequency: Quarterly
- Open access: Yes
- License: CC-BY 4.0
- Impact factor: 5.3 (2022)

Standard abbreviations
- ISO 4: Neurophotonics

Indexing
- ISSN: 2329-423X (print); 2329-4248 (web)
- OCLC no.: 967827368

Links
- Journal homepage; Online access; Online archive

Neurophotonics is a quarterly, peer-reviewed scientific journal covering optical technology applicable to study of the brain and their impact on basic and clinical neuroscience applications, published by SPIE. The editor-in-chief is Anna Devor (Boston University, USA).

== Abstracting and indexing ==
The journal is abstracted and indexed in:

- PubMed
- PubMed Central
- Science Citation Index Expanded
- Inspec
- Scopus
- Embase
- Ei/Compendex

According to the Journal Citation Reports, the journal has a 2020 impact factor of 3.593.
