= NON Records =

Independent record label in Amsterdam

NON Records logo

NON Records is an independent record label based in Amsterdam, Netherlands. Founded in 2010 by musician and graphic designer Bear Damen, the label is known for electronic music with an emphasis on analog recording techniques. The current roster of artists included Bear Damen himself, as well as Palmbomen, THE BENELUX, Renkas, Marius, and HyperHyper.

== History ==
NON Records began as a collaborative effort headed by Bear Damen in Amsterdam. The label emerged from a shared interest in creating electronic music for an international audience with a focus on analog recording techniques. Damen's home in Amsterdam served as both the headquarters and recording studio when the label launched in 2010. In addition to being a recording artist, Bear also works for the graphic design bureau Unknown User, responsible for the label's album and promotional artwork.

Dutch artist and Damen's longtime friend Kai Hugo contributed the first release with his then girlfriend as 'Ganz Nackish'. This project was later abandoned when Hugo shifted his music to a slightly different direction as Palmbomen, which served as the label's fourth official release. Other Amsterdam-based artists including Kyiv-born Renkas, four member electro-rock group THE BENELUX, and Damen himself also released EPs under NON Records.

== Current status ==
NON Records began to gain popularity within Amsterdam, securing a monthly showcase party at celebrated music venue the Melkweg under the name 'NON Night'. Soon artists began touring regularly outside of Europe, hosting showcases at South by Southwest in Austin and the Winter Music Conference in Miami. Artists of the label have been covered by media outlets Vice Magazine, 3VOOR12, Hipster Runoff, and others. The label has since moved to an office in Amsterdam and now includes in addition to the founding members Dutch artists Marius, HyperHyper, and Los Angeles-based artist Kristine.
