= Hope (Toshiko Akiyoshi album) =

Studio album by Toshiko Akiyoshi
- Released: 8 February 2006
- Recorded: 10, 12 December 2005
- Genre: Jazz
- Length: 56:19
- Label: Nippon Crown

Toshiko Akiyoshi chronology
New York Sketch Book (2004)	Hope (2006)	50th Anniversary Concert in Japan (2006)

Singles from Hope
- 1. "Hope (希望)" Released: 2006 December

Professional ratings
Review scores
Source	Rating
Allmusic link	4/5 stars

Hope is a jazz album by pianist Toshiko Akiyoshi. It was recorded by Nippon Crown Records in December, 2005 and released in 2006.

== Track listing (album) ==
All songs composed by Toshiko Akiyoshi except as noted:

1. "Feast in Milano" – 9:47
2. "Memory – 6:35
3. "Hiroshima Bushi" – 6:02
4. "Endless Journey" – 6:46
5. "After Mr. Teng" – 4:30
6. "Sweet Lorraine" (Burwell, Parish) – 6:48
7. "SUMI-E" – 6:40
8. "Drum Conference 3rd Movement" – 5:59
9. "Hope" – 3:12

== Personnel ==
- Toshiko Akiyoshi – piano
- Lewis Nash – drums (Tracks 1, 3, 5, 7, 8)
- George Mraz – bass (Tracks 1, 3, 5, 7, 8)

"Hope (希望)"

Single by Toshiko Akiyoshi & Monday Michiru

from the album Hope
- Released: 2006 December, Japan
- Genre: Jazz
- Label: Nippon Crown
- Songwriter(s): Toshiko Akiyoshi
- Lyricist(s): Shuntarō Tanikawa, English translation by Monday Michiru.

== CD single ==
A CD single, "Hope (希望)" was also released by Nippon Crown and includes the title track version from the album with two new vocal versions - one in Japanese and one in English - sung by Akiyoshi's daughter, Monday Michiru. The composition "Hope" is the closing section of Akiyoshi's "Hiroshima: Rising from the Abyss" suite, first introduced on the 2001 Toshiko Akiyoshi Jazz Orchestra album, Hiroshima - Rising From The Abyss.

== Track listing (CD single) ==
1. "Hope" – 3:37 (Japanese lyrics)
2. "Hope" – 3:30 (English lyrics)
3. "Hope" – 3:11 (instrumental version from the 2006 Toshiko Akiyoshi album Hope)

"Hope" composed by Toshiko Akiyoshi, Japanese Lyrics by Shuntarō Tanikawa, vocals and English translation by Monday Michiru.
