= Kibo simoni =

Scientific classification
- Kingdom: Animalia
- Phylum: Arthropoda
- Subphylum: Chelicerata
- Class: Arachnida
- Order: Araneae
- Infraorder: Araneomorphae
- Family: Salticidae
- Genus: Kibo; Wesołowska & Szűts, 2021
- Species: K. simoni

Binomial name
- Kibo simoni (Lessert, 1925)

Genus of jumping spiders

Kibo is a monotypic genus of east African jumping spiders containing the single species, Kibo simoni. The genus was first described by Wanda Wesolowska and T. Szűts in 2021, and it has only been found in Tanzania. The type species, Kibo simoni, was originally described under the name "Pochyta simoni" it was moved to its own genus in 2021.

== See also ==
- Pochyta
- List of Salticidae genera
