= Ronimo Games =

Dutch video game developer (2007–2023)

- Industry: Video games
- Founded: 2007
- Defunct: August 22, 2023
- Headquarters: Utrecht, Netherlands
- Key people: Fabian Akker, Joost van Dongen, Gijs Hermans, Jasper Koning, Ralph Rademakers, Martijn Thieme, Olivier Thijssen
- Products: Swords & Soldiers; Awesomenauts
- Number of employees: 17 (2015)

Ronimo Games was a Dutch video game developer founded in 2007 by former students of the Utrecht School of the Arts.

== History ==
The team that formed Ronimo Games initially came together under the name of Banana Games, and created the original freeware PC version of de Blob. Publisher THQ noticed the game, was very impressed with the team's work, and acquired the rights to the game. THQ subsequently handed over further development to Blue Tongue Entertainment (Nintendo DS, Wii) and Universomo (mobile/iPhone/iPod).

With the money earned from selling the rights to de Blob the team founded Ronimo Games. The name "Ronimo" came from a brainstorming session in which the team decided to combine the first letters of the words "Robot Ninja Monkey".

In May 2009, the studio released the WiiWare title Swords & Soldiers. In September 2010 the game was released for PlayStation Network with publisher Sony Online Entertainment and in December the Windows and Mac version on Steam. In June 2011 the game was ported by Two Tribes and published by Chillingo for iOS.

The studio developed Awesomenauts, a multiplayer online battle arena for Xbox Live Arcade, PlayStation Network and PC. Despite the publisher's financial problems, the game was released on PC on May 2, 2012. The studio went to Kickstarter to fund Awesomenauts: Starstorm, the game's first expansion. A second expansion, Awesomenauts: Overdrive, was released on March 2, 2016. Ronimo Games released updates for the PC version, adding new characters, addressing balancing, connectivity, and bug-fixes until development on the game was discontinued with the last update released in July 2018.

Swords & Soldiers II was released on Wii U on May 21, 2015, to generally favorable reviews according to Metacritic. Renamed as Swords & Soldiers 2 Shawarmageddon, it was released for PC and PlayStation 4 in November 2018. It was released for Nintendo Switch on March 1, 2019.

Blightbound launched on Steam Early Access on 29th July 2020. After a year in early access, Blightbound fully launched on Steam, PS4, and Xbox One on 27th July 2021. Blightbound's development concluded after Update 1.1.2 in March 2022. Although the developers delivered all promised features from Blightbound's development roadmap, there are still unfixed issues in the game. Reasons for not fixing some of the bugs include: "We are not able to fix this because we don't have next gen dev kits. Without PS5 or Xbox Series X dev kits, we are not able to find the issue causing this problem, so any fix we would want to implement would essentially be guesswork, as there are no debug settings or error logs on commercial consoles. Furthermore, any fix would also need to be tested in a live build of the game, which is not an option.".

Ronimo games was declared bankrupt on 22nd August 2023. An unofficial statement on the company Discord server states that 'We got hit by a series of unfortunate events while working on our latest project, and weren't able to recover despite our best efforts.'.

Atari SA acquired most of Ronimo's intellectual properties, including Awesomenauts and Swords & Soldiers, in October 2023.

== Games developed ==
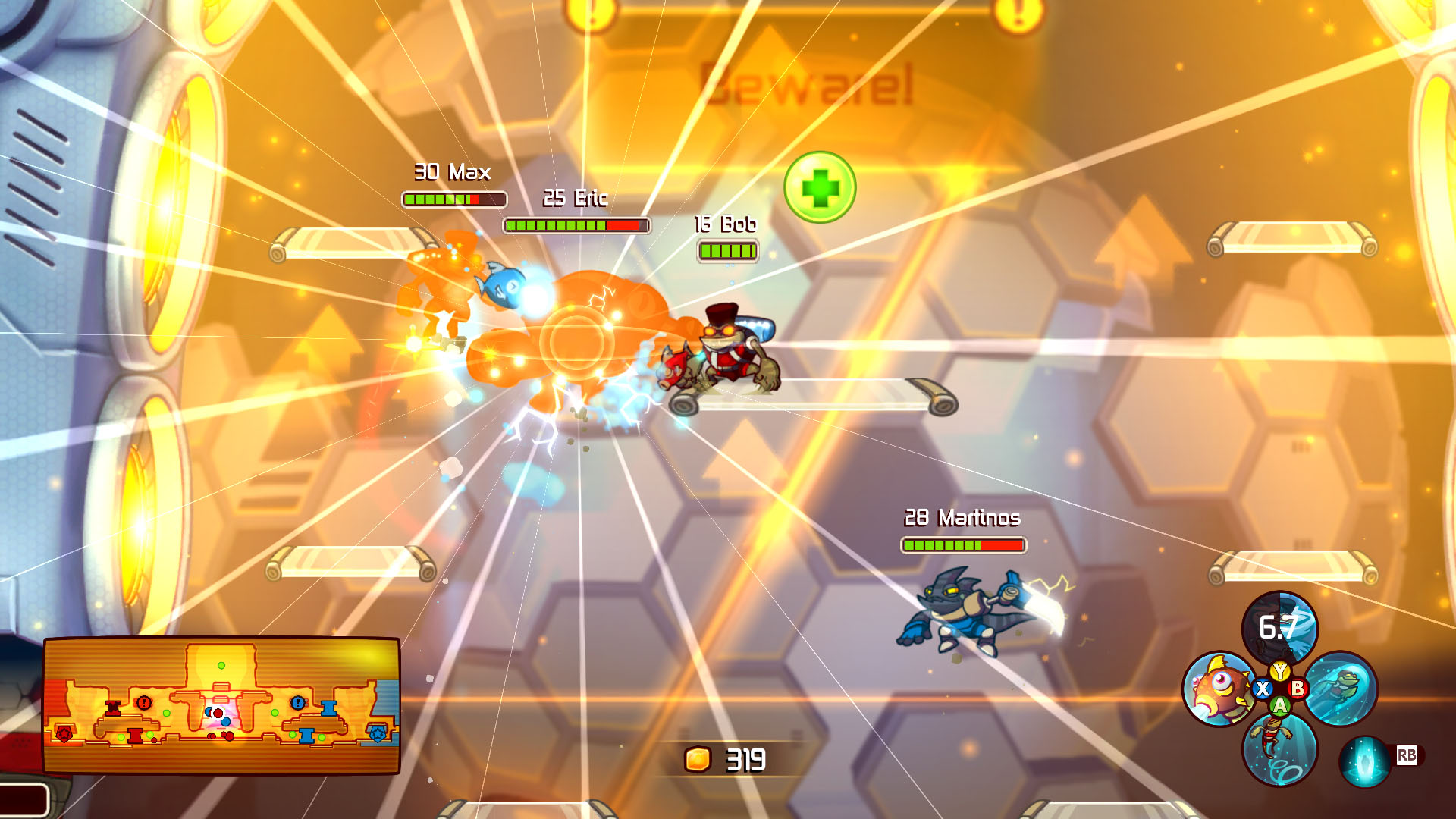
Two teams battle it out in Awesomenauts

=== As Banana Games ===
- The Blob! (Windows, 2006. Dutch: De Blob.)

=== As Ronimo Games ===
- Swords & Soldiers (Wii, 2009; PS3, 2010; Windows, 2010; Mac, 2010; iOS, 2011; Linux, 2012; Android, 2012, 3DS, 2013; Wii U, 2014)
- Awesomenauts (PlayStation 3, 2012; Xbox 360, 2012; Windows, 2012; Mac, 2012; Linux, 2013)
- Swords & Soldiers II (Wii U, 2015)
- Swords & Soldiers 2 Shawarmageddon (PC, 2018; PS4, 2018; Nintendo Switch, 2019)
- Blightbound (PC, 2020 early access; PC, PS4, Xbox One, Xbox Series X/S, 2021)
