= Non (book) =

2009 photobook by Nozomi Sasaki

- Author: Nozomi Sasaki
- Language: Japanese
- Publication date: November 21, 2009
- Media type: Photobook
- Pages: 112 pp

Non is the third photobook by Japanese model Nozomi Sasaki, released in late 2009 by Shueisha.

As Nozomi Sasaki's first self-produced photobook, it consists of photographs of her, several of her columns, and several interviews with her. It also contains her private photos and semi-nude photos.

Soon after the release, on November 29, 2009, a commemorative event was held in Ginza, Tokyo.
