= Non (given name) =

Non is a Welsh feminine given name. Notable people with the name include:

- Non Evans (born 1974), Welsh sportswoman
- Non Stanford (born 1989), Welsh triathlete
- Saint Non, fifth and sixth-century Welsh female saint
