= Nozomi Nishimura =

American biomedical engineer and academic

- Born: Tucson
- Education: University of California, San Diego; Harvard College
- Scientific career
- Workplaces: Cornell University
- Thesis: Microvascular lesions and blood flow in rodent cortex (2006)
- Academic advisors: Eric Mazur

Nozomi Nishimura is an American biomedical engineer who is an associate professor at Cornell University. She was awarded the L'Oréal for Women in Science Fellowship in 2009 and was inducted into the 2024 Class of the AIMBE College of Fellows for her research in intravital microscopy contributing to the understanding of microscale physiology.

== Early life and education ==
Nishimura grew up in Tucson, Arizona. She studied physics at Harvard College, where she worked alongside Eric Mazur on femtosecond laser ablation. She was a graduate student in physics at the University of California, San Diego, where she became interested in neuroscience. She studied blood flow in the brains of rodents and developed models of stroke. To study these mini-strokes she used a tightly focused laser light to excite a dye that had been injected into the bloodstream. In 2006, she moved to Cornell University, where was made a National Institutes of Health and American Heart Association Fellow.

== Research and career ==
Nishimura was appointed to the faculty at Cornell in 2013, where she develops in vivo imaging techniques to study neurodegenerative disease and cancer metastasis. She uses transient multi-photon microscopy to understand cellular dynamics, and femtosecond laser ablation to understand cellular function. In particular, Nishimura showed that two photon excited fluorescence could be used to image individual cells and capillaries. Changes in blood flow influences the progression of disease. For example, Nishimura demonstrated that in mouse models of Alzheimer's disease impeded blood flow in the brain due to neutrophils plugging capillaries, impacting total blood flow. She received an NSF CAREER award in 2015 to further her research.

== Awards and honors ==
- 2009 L'Oréal USA Fellowship for Women in Science
- 2024 Class of the AIMBE College of Fellows

== Selected publications ==
- Demirhan Kobat; Michael E Durst; Nozomi Nishimura; Angela W Wong; Schaffer, Chris; Chris Xu (2009). "Deep tissue multiphoton microscopy using longer wavelength excitation". Optics Express. 17 (16): 13354–13364. doi:10.1364/oe.17.013354. PMID 19654740. Wikidata Q48494423.
- Andy Y Shih; Jonathan D Driscoll; Drew, Patrick; Nozomi Nishimura; Schaffer, Chris; David Kleinfeld (2013). "Two-photon microscopy as a tool to study blood flow and neurovascular coupling in the rodent brain". Journal of Cerebral Blood Flow & Metabolism. 33 (2): 319–319. doi:10.1038/jcbfm.2012.177. PMC 3564205. Wikidata Q62556738.
- Dimitre G Ouzounov; Tianyu Wang; Mengran Wang; et al. (2017). "In vivo three-photon imaging of activity of GCaMP6-labeled neurons deep in intact mouse brain". Nature Methods. 14 (4): 388–390. doi:10.1038/nmeth.4183. PMC 6441362. PMID 28218900. Wikidata Q48300624.
