= Hope (Toshiko Akiyoshi song) =

"Hope (希望)"

Single by Toshiko Akiyoshi & Monday Michiru

from the album Hope
- Released: 2006 December, Japan
- Genre: Jazz
- Label: Nippon Crown
- Songwriter(s): Toshiko Akiyoshi
- Lyricist(s): Shuntarō Tanikawa, English translation by Monday Michiru.

Hope (希望) is a CD single by jazz pianist Toshiko Akiyoshi and singer Monday Michiru released in Japan on the Nippon Crown Record label. The instrumental version of the song "Hope" is from the 2006 Akiyoshi album of the same name. The composition "Hope" is the closing section of Akiyoshi's "Hiroshima: Rising from the Abyss" suite, first introduced on the 2001 Toshiko Akiyoshi Jazz Orchestra album, Hiroshima - Rising From The Abyss.

== Formats and track listing ==
CD single CRCP-10157

1. "Hope" – 3:37 (Japanese lyrics)
2. "Hope" – 3:30 (English lyrics)
3. "Hope" – 3:11 (instrumental version from the 2006 Toshiko Akiyoshi album Hope)

"Hope" composed by Toshiko Akiyoshi, Japanese Lyrics by Shuntarō Tanikawa, English translation by Monday Michiru.

== Personnel ==
- Toshiko Akiyoshi – piano
- Monday Michiru – vocal (tracks 1, 2)
