= Rick Margitza =

American jazz tenor saxophonist (born 1961)

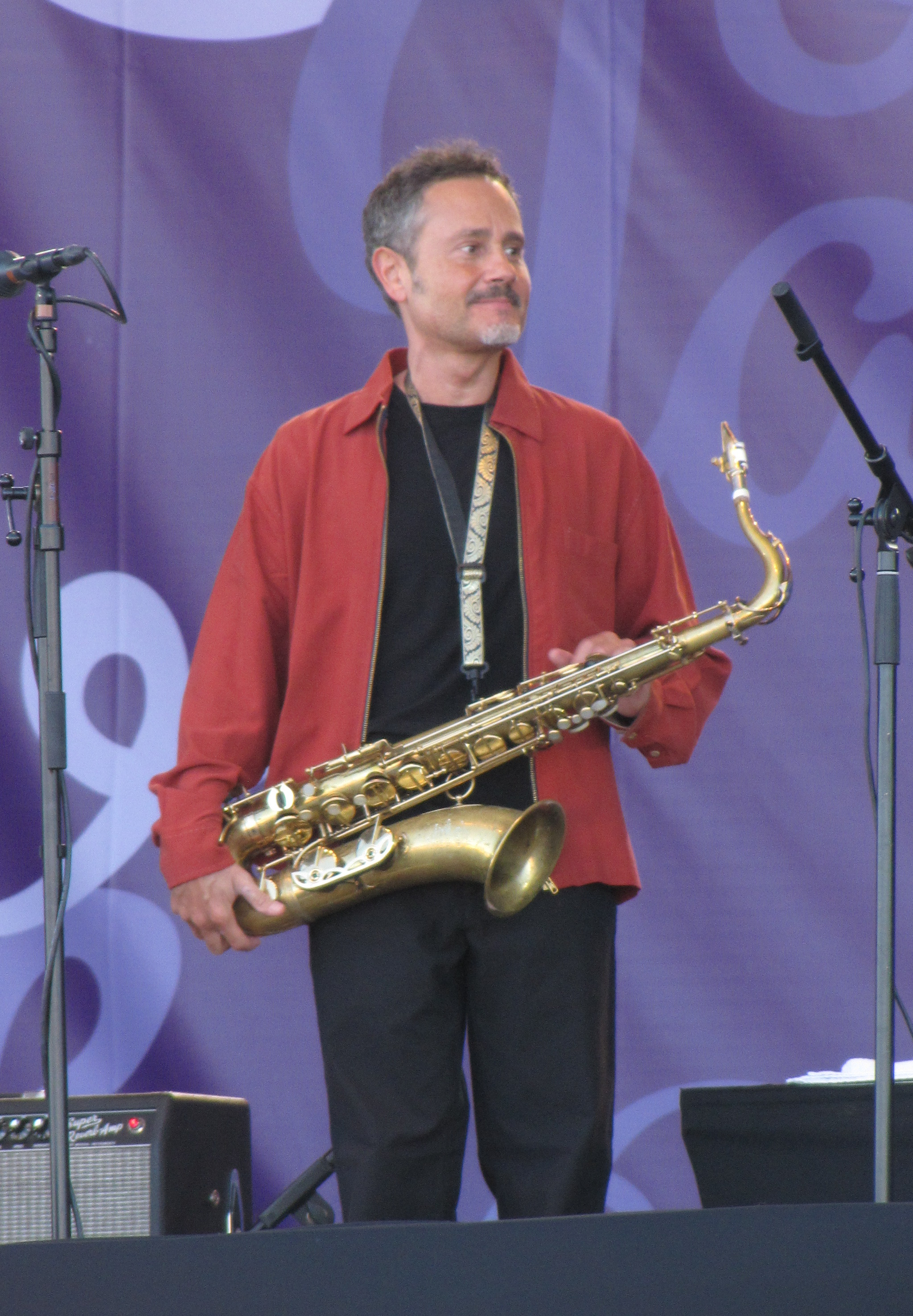
- Rick Margitza, Pori Jazz Festival, 2012

Background information
- Birth name: Richard Dean Margitza
- Born: October 24, 1961 (age 63); Dearborn, Michigan, U.S.
- Genres: Jazz
- Occupation: Musician
- Instrument: Saxophone
- Years active: 1980s–present
- Labels: Blue Note, SteepleChase, Palmetto, Challenge

Rick Margitza (born October 24, 1961) is an American jazz tenor saxophonist.

== Biography ==
Margitza's paternal grandfather, a Hungarian Gypsy violinist, taught him to play the violin at the age of four. His father also played violin with the Detroit Symphony Orchestra. Following this he played piano and oboe, and settled on tenor sax while in Fordson High School. He attended several colleges: Wayne State University, Berklee College of Music, University of Miami, and Loyola University New Orleans. He toured with Maynard Ferguson and Flora Purim in the 1980s, and moved to New York City in 1988, where he played with Miles Davis.

Between 1989 and 1991, Margitza released three albums for Blue Note Records, Color, Hope and This Is New. Q Magazine described Hope as "a soft, glancing rather affected record".

During his career he has recorded mostly with others, including with Eddie Gómez, Tony Williams, Bobby Hutcherson, Maria Schneider, McCoy Tyner, and Chick Corea. He has also composed a saxophone concerto and two symphonies for orchestra.

Since moving to Paris in 2003, he has performed with Martial Solal, François Moutin, Louis Moutin, Ari Hoenig, Franck Amsallem, Jean-Michel Pilc, and Manuel Rocheman.

== Discography ==
=== As leader ===
- Color (Blue Note, 1989) U.S. Jazz No. 9
- Hope (Blue Note, 1991) U.S. Jazz No. 11
- This Is New (Blue Note, 1991) U.S. Jazz No. 19
- Second Home with Jeff Gardner (Musidisc, 1995)
- Work It (SteepleChase, 1995)
- Hands of Time (Challenge, 1995)
- Game of Chance (Challenge, 1997)
- Conversations with Bert Van Den Brink (Challenge, 1999)
- Heart of Hearts (Palmetto, 2000)
- Memento (Palmetto, 2001)
- Bohemia (Nocturne, 2004)
- Gypsy Tenor with Tony Lakatos, Gabor Bolla (Skip, 2017)
- Sacred Hearts (Le Coq, 2021)

=== As sideman ===
With Miles Davis

- Amandla (Warner Bros., 1989)
- Live Around the World (Warner Bros., 1996)
- Miles in Montreux (Jazz Door, 1993)
- The Complete Miles Davis at Montreux 1973–1991 (Warner Music Switzerland, 2002)

With John Fedchock

- John Fedchock New York Big Band (Reservoir, 1995)
- On the Edge (Reservoir, 1997)
- No Nonsense (Reservoir, 2002)
- Up & Running (Reservoir, 2007)

With Andy LaVerne

- Frozen Music (SteepleChase, 1989)
- Severe Clear (SteepleChase, 1990)
- Serenade to Silver (SteepleChase, 1996)

With Lou Rawls

- It's Supposed to Be Fun (Blue Note, 1990)
- The Legendary Lou Rawls (Capitol, 1991)

With Maria Schneider

- Evanescence (Enja, 1994)
- Coming About (Enja, 1996)
- Allégresse (ArtistShare, 2000)
- Days Of Wine And Roses - Live at the Jazz Standard (ArtistShare, 2000)

With others

- Kei Akagi, Mirror Puzzle (AudioQuest 1994)
- Franck Amsallem, A Week in Paris (Nocturne, 2005)
- Burt Bacharach, Blue Note, Plays Burt Bacharach (Blue Note, 2004)
- Bob Belden, Straight to My Heart (Blue Note, 1991)
- Anders Bergcrantz, Live at Sweet Basil (Dragon, 1992)
- Niels Lan Doky, Friendship (Milestone, 1991)
- Dave Douglas, Live at the Bimhuis (Greenleaf, 2005)
- Eliane Elias, Kissed by Nature (Bluebird, 2002)
- Mike Fahn, Close Your Eyes and Listen (Sparky, 2002)
- Maynard Ferguson, Body & Soul (BlackHawk, 1986)
- Eddie Gomez, Next Future (Stretch/GRP, 1993)
- Jimmy Haslip, Arc (GRP, 1993)
- Ellis Marsalis Jr., A Night at Snug Harbor, New Orleans (Somethin' Else 1990)
- Steve Masakowski, What It Was (Blue Note, 1994)
- Ron McClure, Pink Cloud (Naxos, 1997)
- Caecilie Norby, Caecilie Norby (Blue Note, 1995)
- Øyvind Nypan, Republique (Losen, 2013)
- Jarmo Savolainen, First Sight (Timeless, 1992)
- Steps Ahead, Yin-Yang (NYC, 1992)
- Dave Stryker, Blue Degrees (SteepleChase, 1993)
- Trio Töykeät, G'day (EmArcy 1993)
- Lenny White, Present Tense (Hip Bop 1995)
