= Evanescence (Maria Schneider album) =

Studio album by Maria Schneider Jazz Orchestra
- Released: 1994
- Recorded: September 1992
- Studio: Skyline, New York City
- Genre: Avant-garde jazz; experimental big band
- Length: 72:36
- Label: Enja
- Producer: Maria Schneider

Maria Schneider chronology
| Evanescence (1994) | Coming About (1998) |

Professional ratings
Review scores
| Source | Rating |
|---|---|
| AllMusic | 4.5/5 stars |
| The Penguin Guide to Jazz Recordings | 3/4 stars |

Evanescence is the debut studio large-ensemble jazz album by American composer Maria Schneider. It was released in 1994 by Enja Records.

== Track listing ==
All music is composed by Maria Schneider.

| No. | Title | Length |
|---|---|---|
| 1. | "Wyrgly" | 10:29 |
| 2. | "Evanescence" | 11:21 |
| 3. | "Gumba Blue" | 8:59 |
| 4. | "Some Circles" | 5:50 |
| 5. | "Green Piece" | 8:08 |
| 6. | "Gush" | 7:08 |
| 7. | "My Lament" | 4:47 |
| 8. | "Dance You Monster to My Soft Song" | 7:30 |
| 9. | "Last Season" | 8:24 |

== Personnel ==
- Maria Schnieder – conductor
- Mark Vinci – alto saxophone, flute, alto flute, clarinet, piccolo
- Tim Ries – alto saxophone, soprano saxophone, flute, clarinet
- Rich Perry – tenor saxophone, flute
- Rick Margitza – tenor saxophone
- Scott Robinson – baritone saxophone, bass saxophone, bass clarinet, clarinet
- Tony Kadleck – trumpet, flügelhorn
- Greg Gisbert – trumpet, flügelhorn
- Laurie Frink – trumpet, flügelhorn
- Tim Hagans – trumpet, flügelhorn
- John Fedchock – trombone
- Keith O'Quinn – trombone
- Larry Farrell – trombone
- George Flynn – bass trombone, tuba
- Ben Monder – guitar
- Kenny Werner – piano
- Jay Anderson – bass guitar
- Dennis Mackrel – drums
- Emidin Rivera – percussion on "Gush"
- Bill Hayes – flexatone on "Gush"
