= Days of Wine and Roses – Live at the Jazz Standard =

Live album by Maria Schneider Jazz Orchestra
- Released: 2000
- Genre: Experimental big band
- Label: ArtistShare
- Producer: Maria Schneider

Maria Schneider chronology
Coming About (1996)	Days of Wine and Roses – Live at the Jazz Standard (2000)	Allégresse (2000)

Days of Wine and Roses – Live at the Jazz Standard is a live large-ensemble jazz album by the Maria Schneider Orchestra. It was originally released in 2000 as a limited edition sold along with bottles of wine. Subsequently it was re-released by ArtistShare.

== Track listing ==
No.	Title	Writer(s)	Length
1.	"Lately"	Maria Schneider	8:47
2.	"The Willow"	Maria Schneider	7:07
3.	"That Old Black Magic"	Harold Arlen	5:34
4.	"My Ideal"	Newell Chase and Richard Whiting	7:20
5.	"Last Season"	Maria Schneider	2:49
6.	"Começar de Novo"	Ivan Lins	6:44
7.	"Days of Wine and Roses"	Henry Mancini	8:46
8.	"Over the Rainbow"	Harold Arlen	7:23
9.	"Bird Count"	Maria Schneider	9:53

== Personnel ==
- Maria Schneider – conductor
- Tim Ries – alto saxophone, soprano saxophone, clarinet, flute,
- Charles Pillow - alto saxophone, soprano saxophone, clarinet, flute
- Rich Perry – tenor saxophone, flute
- Rick Margitza – tenor saxophone, flute
- Scott Robinson – baritone saxophone, bass saxophone, bass clarinet, clarinet, flute
- Tony Kadleck – trumpet, flügelhorn
- Greg Gisbert – trumpet, flügelhorn
- Laurie Frink – trumpet, flügelhorn
- Ingrid Jensen – trumpet, flügelhorn
- Keith O'Quinn – trombone
- Rick Ciccarone – trombone
- Larry Farrell – trombone
- George Flynn – bass trombone, trombone
- Ben Monder – guitar
- Frank Kimbrough - piano
- Tony Scherr - bass
- Tim Horner - drums
