= Sky Blue (Maria Schneider album) =

Studio album by Maria Schneider
- Released: August 2007
- Recorded: January 6–9, 2007
- Genre: Jazz
- Length: 63:07
- Label: ArtistShare
- Producer: Maria Schneider

Maria Schneider chronology
Concert in the Garden (2004)	Sky Blue (2007)	Winter Morning Walks (2013)

Professional ratings
Review scores
Source	Rating
AllMusic	4.5/5 stars
The Penguin Guide to Jazz Recordings	4/4 stars

Sky Blue is the fifth studio album by American jazz composer Maria Schneider. The album was released in 2007 through ArtistShare and was nominated for two 2008 Grammy Awards for Best Large Jazz Ensemble and Best Instrumental Composition (for "Cerulean Skies").

== Track listing ==
All tracks are written by Maria Schneider.

No.	Title	Length
1.	"The 'Pretty' Road"	13:28
2.	"Aires de Lando"	10:00
3.	"Rich's Piece"	9:34
4.	"Cerulean Skies"	21:57
5.	"Sky Blue"	8:08

== Personnel ==
- Maria Schneider – composer, liner notes, mixing, producer, bird calls
- Charles Pillow – alto saxophone, clarinet, flute, alto flute, bass flute, piccolo
- Steve Wilson – alto saxophone, soprano saxophone, clarinet, flute, alto flute
- Rich Perry – flute, tenor saxophone, bird calls
- Donny McCaslin – clarinet, tenor saxophone
- Scott Robinson – baritone saxophone, clarinet, bass clarinet
- Jason Carder – trumpet, flügelhorn, bird calls
- Ingrid Jensen – trumpet, flügelhorn, bird calls, electronics
- Laurie Frink – trumpet, flügelhorn
- Tony Kadleck – trumpet, flügelhorn
- Marshall Gilkes – trombone, bird calls
- Ryan Keberle – trombone
- Keith O'Quinn – trombone
- George Flynn – bass trombone, contrabass trombone
- Frank Kimbrough – piano
- Gary Versace – accordion
- Ben Monder – guitar
- Jay Anderson – bass
- Clarence Penn – drums
- Gonzalo Grau – cajón, palmas, percussion
- Luciana Souza – vocals
- Pernell Saturnino – bird calls
- Gene Paul – mastering
- Joe Ferla – engineer, mixing
