= Allégresse (album) =

Studio album by Maria Schneider Orchestra
- Released: 2000
- Recorded: January 26–27, 2000
- Genre: Jazz, experimental big band
- Label: Enja
- Producer: Bob Thompson

Maria Schneider Orchestra chronology
Days Of Wine And Roses - Live at the Jazz Standard (2000)	Allégresse (2000)	Concert in the Garden (2004)

Professional ratings
Review scores
Source	Rating
AllMusic	3/5 stars

Allégresse is the third studio album by American jazz composer Maria Schneider. The album was released in 2000 by Enja Records.

== Track listing ==
All tracks are written by Maria Schneider.

No.	Title	Length
1.	"Hang Gliding"	13:20
2.	"Nocturne"	7:51
3.	"Allégresse"	11:46
4.	"Dissolution"	20:47
5.	"Journey Home"	9:06
6.	"Sea of Tranquility"	8:22

== Personnel ==
- Tim Ries – soprano saxophone, clarinet, flute, alto flute
- Charles Pillow – alto saxophone, soprano saxophone, clarinet, flute, piccolo, oboe, English horn
- Rich Perry – tenor saxophone, flute
- Rick Margitza – tenor saxophone, soprano saxophone, flute
- Scott Robinson – baritone saxophone, bass saxophone, flute, alto flute, clarinet, bass clarinet
- Tony Kadleck – trumpet, piccolo trumpet, flugelhorn
- Greg Gisbert – trumpet, flugelhorn
- Laurie Frink – trumpet, flugelhorn
- Ingrid Jensen – trumpet, flugelhorn
- Dave Ballou – trumpet, flugelhorn
- Keith O'Quinn – trombone
- Rock Ciccarone – trombone
- Larry Farrell – trombone
- George Flynn – bass trombone, contrabass trombone
- Ben Monder – guitar
- Frank Kimbrough – piano
- Tony Scherr – double bass
- Tim Horner – drums
- Jeff Ballard – percussion
