= Ryan Keberle =

Musical artist (born 1980)

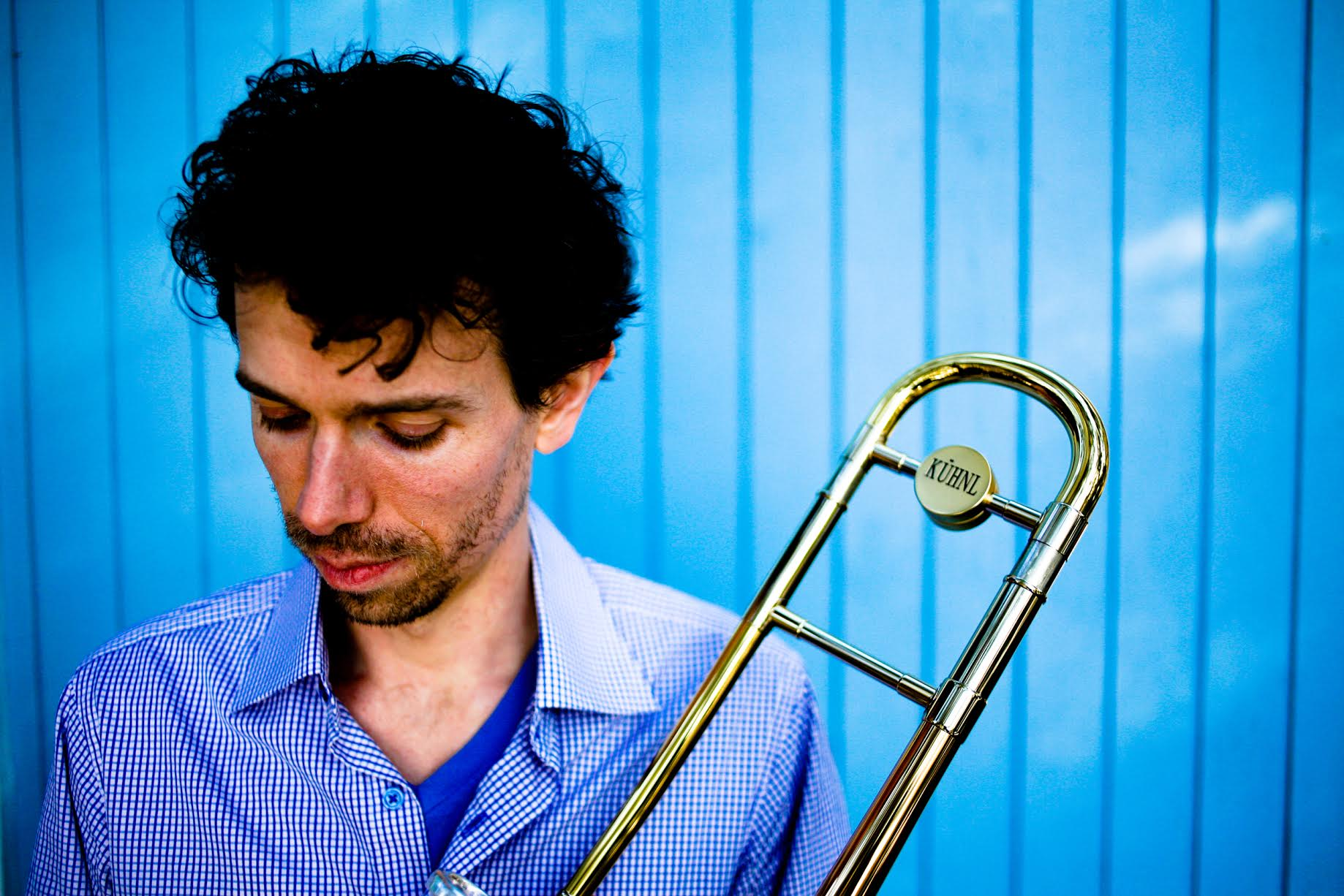

Background information
- Born: Ryan Daniel Keberle; June 16, 1980 (age 46); Bloomington, Indiana
- Genres: Jazz, modern jazz, indie jazz
- Occupations: Musician, composer, arranger
- Instruments: Trombone, piano, melodica
- Years active: 1999-present
- Labels: Greenleaf Music, Alternate Side Records
- Website: ryankeberle.com

Ryan Keberle (born June 16, 1980) is an American trombone player, composer, arranger, and educator. Described by The New York Times as a "trombonist of vision and composure", he leads Ryan Keberle & Catharsis, Collectiv do Brasil, his All Ears Orchestra, the Big Band Living Legacy Project and co-leads the international chamber jazz ensemble, Reverso. Keberle has performed with David Bowie, Maria Schneider, Wynton Marsalis, Darcy James Argue, Alicia Keys, and Sufjan Stevens, among others, and has appeared on seven Grammy Award-winning records.

Keberle currently directs the jazz program at Hunter College. A "relentlessly prolific sideman", Keberle has appeared on movie soundtracks for filmmakers including Woody Allen and in the pit for Broadway musicals such as In the Heights.

== Early life and education ==
Keberle was born in Bloomington, Indiana, to Ann Winterer and Dan Keberle. He grew up in Spokane, Washington, where his father, a trumpeter, teaches jazz studies at Whitworth University, and directs the Whitworth Jazz Ensemble. At four, Keberle was taught to play the piano by his mother, a piano teacher and church choir director, and through the Suzuki Method he learned to play the violin. In fifth grade, at the encouragement of his father, he began to play the trombone. He was inspired by the tradition of the instrument in jazz history, as well as by the horn bands Chicago, Blood, Sweat & Tears, Tower of Power, and Earth, Wind & Fire. In high school, he discovered jazz artists including John Coltrane and Dexter Gordon, and would play along with their records.

Keberle continued to play the piano while focused on the trombone. He studied with David Matterne, the principal trombonist for the Spokane Symphony, and as a teenager he performed with the Spokane Youth Symphony and sat in with the Spokane Jazz Orchestra and the Whitworth Jazz Ensemble. The valedictorian of his class, Keberle graduated from Mead High School in 1998.

Following his high school graduation, Keberle enrolled at Whitworth with a double major in physics and music. He transferred to the Manhattan School of Music in 1999, where he studied trombone with Steve Turre and composition with Michael Abene and Manny Albam. As a student at the Manhattan School, Keberle first encountered several musicians he would continue to collaborate with, including the Argentinian bassist and composer Pedro Giraudo. In 2001 — the year he graduated — Keberle was selected as the artistic director for New York City's first youth jazz orchestra, Jazz Band Classic, a program of the New York Symphony, and won the William H. Borden Award for Musical Excellence in Jazz from Manhattan School of Music.

After he earned his undergraduate degree, Keberle was selected to attend Juilliard as a student in their inaugural Jazz Performance program. Studying trombone with Wycliffe Gordon and composition with David Berger, he was one of the first musicians to earn an artist diploma in Jazz Performance from Juilliard.

== Career ==
Keberle played professionally while a student; he supported himself mainly as a pianist during his first four years in New York. Following his graduation, he performed with the David Berger Jazz Orchestra, the Lincoln Center Jazz Orchestra, the Maria Schneider Jazz Orchestra and Wynton Marsalis, among others. His compositions "Cylindrically" and "Something Speaking" were performed by the Juilliard Jazz Orchestra, and "Slants", a commissioned piece, was performed by the Spokane Jazz Orchestra. Based in Brooklyn, he freelanced as a recording and performing musician in multiple genres — in addition to traditional and avant-garde jazz, Keberle played with Latin, R&B, and rock artists. He was an orchestra member for several Broadway productions, performed in ensembles for television shows, and served as the music director at St. James Catholic Church.

In 2003, he formed the Ryan Keberle Double Quartet. Composed of piano, bass, drums, two trombones, trumpet, French horn, and tuba, the Ryan Keberle Double Quartet's self-titled debut was released on Alternate Side in 2007. It was followed by Heavy Dreaming in 2010. Both albums were critically well-received; Wondering Sound wrote that the records displayed the "wonderful emotional transparency of Keberle's striking compositions and arrangements," and Heavy Dreaming was selected as one of the best records of the year by publications including JazzTimes and Stereophile.

In 2012, after touring internationally with Sufjan Stevens, Keberle formed Catharsis, a pianoless acoustic quartet, with Mike Rodriguez on trumpet, Jorge Roeder on bass and Eric Doob on drums. They released their first album, Music Is Emotion, on Alternate Side in 2013. The album was described by the Los Angeles Times as "a potent blend of cinematic sweep and lush, ear-grabbing melodies." All About Jazz wrote: "In just over a decade, Keberle has become one of the most in-demand trombonists on the scene, and he's done so by using his considerable technique to communicate with, rather than play at, the people who encounter his horn. Keberle keeps wide-ranging company, working with everybody from Latin luminary Ivan Lins to compositional queen Maria Schneider to pop/R&B superstar Alicia Keys, but his raison d'être isn't diversification; he's all about touching the soul through sound means."

In 2014, Catharsis signed to Dave Douglas' Greenleaf Music. They released their second album, Into the Zone, in September, adding vocalist Camila Meza. Azul Infinito, an album inspired by Keberle's experience working with South American composers, was released in March 2016. "Keberle might seem like an unlikely candidate for jazz stardom—he is primarily a brilliant trombonist, after all — but his band is propulsive and infectious, grooving and gorgeous," PopMatters wrote in a May 2016 review.

Keberle has directed the jazz program at Hunter College since 2004. In addition to other colleges and universities, Keberle has conducted trombone improvisation clinics at Berklee College of Music, the Brubeck Institute, Cornish College of the Arts, Dartmouth College, New York University, the Royal Academy of Music in London, Cork College of Music in Ireland, and the Conservatory del Liceu in Barcelona. He has led clinics throughout the New York City public school system as part of the American Composer Orchestra's educational outreach program, and has guest-conducted local and all-region jazz bands. Keberle has taught privately since 1999.

In 2016, Keberle helped form Reverso, a trans-oceanic chamber jazz ensemble featuring French pianist and composer, Frank Woeste, and French improvising cellist and ECM recording artist, Vincent Courtois, and, at times, Jeff Ballard or Greg Hutchinson on drums. Since the ensemble's inception in 2016, Reverso has released two albums on the Belgian OutNote record label and performed for audiences throughout the United States and Europe.

In 2017 Catharsis turned its attention to political turmoil in the U.S. with the protest album Find the Common, Shine a Light, praised by The Nation as “unpretentiously intelligent and profoundly moving.” Find the Common also saw Keberle emerging as a solid performing keyboardist (his first instrument) and as a vocalist. In 2019 Keberle and Catharsis released their latest album, The Hope I Hold, with lyrics and inspiration drawn from the Langston Hughes’ poem, “Let America be America Again”. The album received critical praise from the NY Times saying “all those tones give the lovely, splayed-out energy, turning his sighing compositions, into big, open canvases” and The Wall Street Journal said the “wordless vocals, lyrics and solos emerge from gorgeous weaves of musical textures.”

Keberle was featured in Downbeat Magazine's Blindfold Test in January 2020.

In December 2017 Keberle traveled to São Paulo, Brazil while on a sabbatical to immerse himself in the Brazilian musical community and culture. During his visit Mr. Keberle was invited to perform alongside the longstanding trio of Felipe Silveira, Thiago Alves, and Paulinho Vicente. The newly formed quartet performed numerous gigs in and around São Paulo and immediately recognized the chemistry amongst the collective's musicians leading to the formation of Collectiv do Brasil. This musical trust translated to a music that transcends genres, cultures, traditions, and categories while highlighting the universal beauty of the afro-centric roots of both jazz and Brazilian music. The following summer Collectiv do Brasil recorded their debut album, Sonhos da Esquina, at the legendary Gargolandia Recording Studio in São Paulo. The result is a record that features original compositions that pay tribute to the inspirational music of Milton Nascimento and Toninho Horta along with creative arrangements of Nascimento and Horta compositions by Mr. Keberle and Mr. Silveira. The project illustrates the universal language that connects all Afro-centric music traditions and its power to transcend language barriers and cultural differences. In 2022 the band recorded their second album, Considerando, inspired by the music of Brazilian singer/songwriter, Edu Lobo. Edu Lobo himself was impressed by the record and responded with a heartfelt letter praising Collectiv do Brasil for their interpretations of his music.

== Personal life ==
Keberle and his wife Erica live in the Sullivan County, Catskills, NY.

== Awards and recognition ==
- Yamaha Young Performing Artist (1998)
- William H. Borden Award for Musical Excellence in Jazz, Manhattan School of Music (2001)
- Finalist, Thelonious Monk International Jazz Trombone Competition (Herbie Hancock Institute of Jazz) (2003)
- Latin Jazz Corner, Trombonist of the Year (2009)
- Latin Jazz Corner, Trombonist of the Year (2010)
- PSC-CUNY Research Grant, Leaving the Blues Behind (2012)
- PSC-CUNY Research Grant, Leaving the Blues Behind (2013)
- Hunter College Presidential Award in Excellence for Scholarship/Creative Work (2013)
- AEC Grant for partial funding of Big Band Living Legacy Project (2014)
- AEC Grant for partial funding of Big Band Living Legacy Project (2015)
- No. 1 Rising Star Trombonist, Downbeat International Critics' Poll (2015)
- Presidential Fund for Faculty Advancement Grant (2015)
- French American Exchange Grant, Mid-Atlantic Arts Foundation and The Doris Duke Foundation (2015)
- Shuster Award (2016)
- PSC-CUNY Research Grant (2015–2016)
- PSC-CUNY Research Grant (2016–2017)
- Presidential Travel Award (2016)
- Presidential Travel Award (2017)
- Chamber Music America New Jazz Works, funded by the Doris Duke Foundation (2016)
- AEC Grant for partial funding of Big Band Living Legacy Project (2017)
- Mid-Atlantic Arts Council, Jazz Touring Grant (2017)
- PSC-CUNY Research Grant, Crossing Disciplines: Jazz Performance Presented in a Site Specific, Interdisciplinary Setting using Multimedia Techniques (2017–2018)
- Hunter College Fellowship Leave (2017–2018)
- Presidential Travel Award (2018)
- French American Exchange Jazz Touring Grant (2018–2020)
- Copland Foundation Grant (2020)
- 2020 Jazz Times Critics’ Poll Best Trombonist (2020)
- PSC-CUNY Research Grant, An Exploration of Cross-Cultural Performance Practices Found in Brazilian and American Afro-Centric Musical Traditions (2020–2021)
- South Arts ‘Jazz Road’ Touring Grant (2021)

== Discography ==
=== As Ryan Keberle and Catharsis ===
- Music is Emotion (Alternate Side, 2013)
- Live at WNYC Soundcheck (Alternate Side, 2013)
- Into the Zone (Greenleaf Music, 2014)
- Azul Infinito (Greenleaf Music, 2016)
- Find the Common, Shine a Light (Greenleaf Music, 2017)
- The Hope I Hold (Greenleaf Music, 2019)
- Music is Connection (Alternate Side, 2024)

=== As Ryan Keberle Double Quartet ===
- Heavy Dreaming (Alternate Side, 2010)
- The Ryan Keberle Double Quartet (Alternate Side, 2007)

=== As Reverso ===
- Suite Ravel (Alternate Side, 2017)
- The Melodic Line (OutNote, 2019)
- Live (OutNote, 2020)
- Harmonic Alchemy (OutNote, 2022)
- Shooting Star - Étoile Filante (Alternate Side, 2023)

=== As Collectiv do Brasil ===
- Sonhos da Esquina (Alternate Side, 2022)
- Considerando (Alternate Side, 2023)
- Choro das Aguas (Alternate Side, 2025)

=== As Ryan Keberle's Octet ===
- Bright Moments (Positone, 2024)

== Selected recordings ==
- Alicia Keys, Superwoman, J Records (2007)
- Maria Schneider Jazz Orchestra, Sky Blue, ArtistShare (2007)
- In the Heights cast and orchestra, In the Heights Original Broadway Cast Recording, Ghostlight Records (2008)
- Darcy James Argue's Secret Society, Infernal Machines, New Amsterdam Records (2009)
- David Byrne/St. Vincent, Love This Giant, Todo Mundo (2012)
- Ryan Truesdale's Gil Evans Centennial Project, Gil Evans Centennial Project, Artist Share (2012)
- Phillip Phillips, Behind the Light, Interscope Records (2014)
- Darcy James Argue's Secret Society, Brooklyn Babylon, New Amsterdam (2013)
- Rufus Reid, Quiet Pride, Motéma Music (2013)
- Alan Ferber's Expanded Ensemble, March Sublime, Sunnyside Records(2013)
- David Bowie, "Sue (Or in a Season of Crime)", Parlophone (2014)
- Miguel Zenón, Identities Are Changeable, Miel Music (2014)
- Emilio Solla y La Inestable de Brooklyn, Second Half, Independent (2014)
- Sufjan Stevens/Nico Muhly, Planetarium (2014)
- Maria Schneider Jazz Orchestra, The Thompson Fields, Artist Share (2015)
- Ryan Truesdale's Gil Evans Project, Lines of Color, Artist Share (2015)
- Dave Douglas, The Serial Sessions, Greenleaf Music (2015)
- Darcy James Argue's Secret Society, Real Enemies, New Amsterdam (2016)
- Josh Deutsch’s Pannonia, The Road to Pannonia, Josh Deutsch Music (2017)
- John Vanore Big Band, Stolen Moments: Celebrating Oliver Nelson, Acoustical Concepts (2017)
- Joe Fiedler's Big Sackbut, Live in Graz, Multiphonics (2020)
- Dave Douglas, Overcome, Greenleaf Music (2020)
- Maria Schneider Orchestra, Data Lords, Artist Share, (2020)
- Denin Slage-Koch, It Comes in Waves, (2023)
- Darcy James Argue's Secret Society, 'Dynamic Maximum Tension', Nonesuch (2023)
