= Luciana Souza =

Brazilian jazz singer and composer

- Born: 12 July 1966 (age 59) São Paulo, Brazil
- Genres: Jazz, bossa nova, pop, classical, chamber
- Occupation: Singer
- Years active: 1992–present
- Labels: Sunnyside, Verve
- Website: LucianaSouza.com

Luciana Souza (born 12 July 1966) is a Brazilian jazz singer and composer who also works in bossa nova, pop, classical and chamber music. She won a Grammy Award in 2007, and has been nominated for seven others, most recently in 2024. Souza is considered to be one of jazz's leading singers and interpreters. The New York Times called her voice "smooth-surfaced, coolly sensuous and dartingly agile."

== Early life and education ==
Souza was born and raised in São Paulo, Brazil. Her father Walter Santos was a singer, songwriter, and commercial musician who also contributed background vocals to bossa nova recordings by Antônio Carlos Jobim and João Gilberto, and her mother Tereza Souza was a poet and lyricist. She began her recording career at age three with a radio commercial.

In 1985, at age 17, she left Brazil for the United States to attend Berklee College of Music in Boston, where she received a bachelor's degree in jazz composition, and later spent four years as a member of the faculty. She earned a master's degree in jazz studies from the New England Conservatory of Music and taught for four years at the Manhattan School of Music. Souza has also taught at the University of California, Los Angeles and California Institute of the Arts, and since 2024 is a professor at the USC Thornton School of Music.

== Career ==
Souza has performed and recorded with Herbie Hancock, Paul Simon, James Taylor, Bobby McFerrin, Maria Schneider, Danilo Pérez, Guillermo Klein, John Patitucci, and others. She has been a soloist in new works by composers including Osvaldo Golijov, Derek Bermel, Patrick Zimmerli, Rachel Grimes, Angélica Negrón, Shara Nova, Caroline Shaw, and Sarah Kirkland Snider, performing with the New York Philharmonic, Atlanta Symphony Orchestra, Los Angeles Philharmonic, Los Angeles Chamber Orchestra, Los Angeles Master Chorale, American Composers Orchestra, Los Angeles Guitar Quartet, and A Far Cry.

Souza produced her first album, An Answer to Your Silence (1998), herself. For her second album, The Poems of Elizabeth Bishop and Other Songs (2000), she composed a song cycle revolving around the poetry of Elizabeth Bishop, while her 2004 album Neruda features her compositions and vocals set to the words of Pablo Neruda.

Souza appeared in the 2008 David Mamet film Redbelt, and cowrote/translated several songs for the soundtrack. Her song "Muita Bobeira" was featured as a music sample on Windows Vista. On her 2012 album The Book of Chet, she covers the songs of Chet Baker. Her 2018 album The Book of Longing presents her settings of poems by Leonard Cohen, Emily Dickinson, Edna St. Vincent Millay, and Christina Rossetti. That year, she collaborated and toured with the Yellowjackets in support of their album Raising Our Voice.

Souza was San Francisco Performances' jazz artist in residence from 2005 through 2010. In 2022, she received a Chamber Music America New Jazz Works grant to compose a new album-length piece, Twenty-Four Short Musical Episodes.

She collaborated with Trio Corrente on her 2023 album Cometa, with covers of Brazilian classics and original samba songs. Their performance on NPR's Tiny Desk concert series premiered on May 10, 2024, with the set list featuring songs from Cometa: "Bem Que Te Avise", "Baião Joy", "Cometa", and "Quando Você Vier".

== Personal life ==
In 2006, Souza married record producer and musician Larry Klein. They have one son, Noah. They live in Los Angeles.

== Awards and honors ==
Souza won a Grammy Award in 2007 as a featured vocalist on "Amelia" on Herbie Hancock's album River: The Joni Letters. She was nominated for Best Jazz Vocal Album for Brazilian Duos (2003), North and South (2004), Duos II (2006), Tide (2010), and The Book of Chet (2013). She was nominated for Best Latin Jazz Album for Duos III (2013) and Cometa (2024). She was named Female Singer of the Year in 2005 and 2013 by the Jazz Journalists Association.

| Year | Nominee / work | Award | Result |
|---|---|---|---|
| 2003 | Brazilian Duos | Grammy Award for Best Jazz Vocal Album | Nominated |
| 2004 | North and South | Grammy Award for Best Jazz Vocal Album | Nominated |
| 2005 | Luciana Souza | Jazz Journalists Association Best Female Jazz Singer | Won |
| 2006 | Duos II | Grammy Award for Best Jazz Vocal Album | Nominated |
| 2008 | River: The Joni Letters | Grammy Award for Album of the Year | Won |
| 2010 | Tide | Grammy Award for Best Jazz Vocal Album | Nominated |
| 2013 | Duos III | Grammy Award for Best Latin Jazz Album | Nominated |
| 2013 | The Book of Chet | Grammy Award for Best Jazz Vocal Album | Nominated |
| 2013 | Luciana Souza | Jazz Journalists Association Best Female Jazz Singer | Won |
| 2024 | Cometa | Grammy Award for Best Latin Jazz Album | Nominated |

== Discography ==
=== As leader ===
- An Answer to Your Silence (NYC Records 6030, 1998)
- The Poems of Elizabeth Bishop and Other Songs (Sunnyside 1091, 2000)
- Brazilian Duos (Sunnyside 1100, 2002)
- Norte e Sul North and South (Sunnyside 1112, 2003)
- Neruda (Sunnyside 1132, 2004)
- Duos II (Sunnyside 1142, 2005)
- The New Bossa Nova (Verve B0009456 02, 2007)
- Tide (Verve B0012688 02, 2009)
- Duos III (Sunnyside 1315, 2012)
- The Book of Chet (Sunnyside 1316, 2012)
- Speaking in Tongues (Sunnyside 1410, 2015)
- The Book of Longing (Sunnyside 1518, 2018)
- Storytellers (with the WDR Big Band) (Sunnyside 1575, 2020)
- Cometa (with Trio Corrente) (Sunnyside 1696, 2023)
- Twenty-Four Short Musical Episodes (Sunnyside, 2024)

=== As guest ===
With Till Bronner

- Oceana (Verve, 2006)
- Rio (Verve, 2008)

With Guillermo Klein

- Los Guachos II (Sunnyside, 1999)
- Los Guachos III (Sunnyside, 2002)

With Donny McCaslin

- The Way Through (Arabesque, 2003)
- Soar (Sunnyside, 2006)

With Bob Moses

- 1993: Time Stood Still (Gramavision, 1994)
- 1998: Nishoma (Grapeshots, 2000)

With John Patitucci

- Communion (Concord Jazz, 2001)
- Songs, Stories & Spirituals (Concord, 2003)

With Danilo Pérez

- Central Avenue (Impulse!, 1998)
- Motherland (Verve, 2000)

With Madeleine Peyroux

- Bare Bones (Rounder/Decca, 2009)
- Anthem (Decca, 2018)

With Maria Schneider

- Concert in the Garden (ArtistShare, 2004)
- Sky Blue (ArtistShare, 2007)

With Edward Simon

- Simplicitas (Criss Cross, 2005)
- David Binney, Oceanos (Criss Cross, 2007)

With others

- Clarice Assad, Imaginarium (Adventure Music, 2014)
- Cyro Baptista, Beat the Donkey (Tzadik, 2002)
- Adoniran Barbosa, O Poeta do Bexiga (Som Livre, 1990)
- Walter Becker, Circus Money (Mailboat, 2008)
- Derek Bermel and Alarm Will Sound, Canzonas Americanas (Cantaloupe, 2012)
- Stephen Bishop, Romance in Rio (One Eighty Music, 2007)
- Oscar Castro-Neves, All One (Mack Avenue, 2006)
- George Garzone, Alone (NYC, 1995)
- Aaron Goldberg, Worlds (Sunnyside, 2006)
- Osvaldo Golijov, Oceana (Deutsche Grammophon, 2007)
- Herbie Hancock, River: The Joni Letters (Verve, 2007)
- Fred Hersch, Two Hands Ten Voices (2004)
- Fernando Huergo, The Structure of Survival (Fresh Sound, 2006)
- Steve Kuhn, The Best Things (Reservoir, 2000)
- Los Angeles Guitar Quartet, LAGQ Brazil (Telarc, 2007)
- Arthur Maia, Arthur Maia (Paradoxx, 1997)
- Gregoire Maret, Wanted (Sunnyside, 2016)
- Bobby McFerrin, Vocabularies (Emarcy, 2010)
- Vince Mendoza, Nights On Earth (Art of Groove, 2011)
- Moss, Moss (Sunnyside, 2008)
- Hermeto Pascoal, Festa Dos Deuses (Polygram, 1992)
- Clarence Penn, Saomaye (Verve, 2002)
- Rebecca Pidgeon, Behind the Velvet Curtain (Great American Music Company, 2008)
- Dafnis Prieto, Cantar (Dafnison Music, 2022)
- Andrew Rathbun, Atwood Suites (Origin Records, 2017)
- Tim Ries, The Rolling Stones Project (Concord, 2005)
- Ryan Truesdel and Gil Evans, Centennial (Artist Share, 2012)
- Yellowjackets, Raising Our Voice (Mack Avenue, 2018)
- Miguel Zenon, Ceremonial (Marsalis Music, 2004)
