= Greg Gisbert =

American jazz trumpeter (born 1966)

Gregory Lyle Gisbert (born February 2, 1966, in Mobile, Alabama) is an American jazz trumpeter and flugelhornist.

== Early years and school ==
Gisbert played drums with his father as a child. He moved with his family to Denver in 1971. Whilst in the fourth grade at Walt Whitman Elementary, his drumming could be heard throughout the school grounds during recess which he sometimes skipped to practice in the hall. Later he picked up the Flugelhorn. During high school in Colorado Gisbert auditioned for and played with the 1983/84 McDonald's All-American High School Jazz Band; he toured and recorded with the group. After high school he attended the Berklee College of Music in 1984-85, where he recorded with Cyrus Chestnut as part of Phil Wilson's Rainbow Band.

== Professional work ==
During his brief time in school at Berklee, Gisbert was offered to go on the road with Buddy Rich as a connection made through Wilson. Gisbert's credits since then include: Buddy Rich (1985–86), Woody Herman's band under Frank Tiberi's direction (1987–89), John Fedchock and Maria Schneider, Gary Burton (1989), Lew Anderson (1989) and Toshiko Akiyoshi (1989 and subsequently). In the 1990s he played with Mingus Epitaph (1990–92), Frank Wess, Clark Terry, Mickey Tucker and Buck Clayton (1991), Danny D'Imperio (1991) Norman Simmons (1992), John Hicks (1992), Fedchock and Schneider again, and with the Convergence quintet. From 1994 to 1997 he worked with Joe Roccisano, and recorded with Chuck Bergeron, Loren Schoenberg and Ken Peplowski. He accompanied Carol Sloane and Susannah McCorkle in large ensembles in 1996. He has recorded three albums under his own name for Criss Cross Jazz.

Gisbert has appeared on seven recordings by the Maria Schneider Orchestra, including Concert in the Garden and The Thompson Fields, both of which won Grammy Awards.

In recent years, Gisbert has become an active jazz educator, teaching at festivals and conducting clinics across the United States. He also had two stints on the Jazz faculty at the University of Miami in the 2000s. Gisbert is currently a Lecturer in Jazz Studies at University of Colorado Boulder.

He has also branched out in producing; bringing the up-and-coming conductor and composer, Chie Imiazumi, to the public's attention, acting as producer of her debut album, Unfailing Kindness.

Gisbert is also founding member of Convergence, whose members include Paul Romaine on drums and John Gunther on saxophone. The group is based out of Colorado and can be heard playing in Denver at Dazzle Jazz Club.

Greg also founded the Greg Gisbert Syndicate in early 2016 and appeared in an eight-week Artist in Residency at Nocturne Jazz & Supper Club. Members of this band included Guitarist Steve Kovalcheck, Bassist Patrick McDevitt, Pianist Annie Booth, and Drummer Mark Emmons.

In 2024, Gisbert was inducted into the Colorado Music Hall of Fame. Inductees were announced at the Five Points Jazz Festival.

== Discography ==
=== As leader ===
- Harcology (Criss Cross Jazz, 1992)
- Gisbert and Gunther, Big Lunage (Capri Records, 1993)
- On Second Thought (Criss Cross, 1996)
- Court Jester (Criss Cross, 1999)

=== As sideman ===
With the Joe Roccisano Orchestra

- Leave Your Mind Behind (Landmark, 1995)

With Annie Booth Sextet

- Abundance (Live At Mighty Fine), 2017

With Maria Schneider Orchestra

- Evanescence (Enja Records, 1994)
- Coming About (Enja Records, 1996)
- Days of Wine and Roses - Live at the Jazz Standard (ArtistShare, 2000 [limited edition], 2005 [regular release])
- Allegresse (Enja Records, 2000)
- Concert in the Garden (ArtistShare, 2005)
- The Thompson Fields (ArtistShare, 2017)
- Data Lords (ArtistShare, 2021)
- Decades (ArtistShare, 2024)
