= Coming About =

Studio album by Maria Schneider
- Released: 1996
- Recorded: November 9–10, 1995
- Studio: Clinton Recording Studios, New York City
- Genre: Avant-garde jazz
- Length: 67:45
- Label: Enja

Maria Schneider chronology
Evanescence (1994)	Coming About (1996)	Days Of Wine And Roses - Live at the Jazz Standard (2000)

Professional ratings
Review scores
Source	Rating
The Penguin Guide to Jazz Recordings	3.5/4 stars

Coming About is a large-ensemble jazz album by composer, arranger, and conductor Maria Schneider and her orchestra that was released in 1996 by Enja Records.

== Track listing ==
No.	Title	Writer(s)	Length
1.	"El Viento"	Maria Schneider	11:17
2.	"Love Theme from Spartacus"	Alex North	7:04
3.	"Scenes From Childhood, 1: Bombshelter Beast"	Maria Schneider	9:43
4.	"Scenes From Childhood, 2: Night Watchmen"	Maria Schneider	11:26
5.	"Scenes From Childhood, 3: Coming About"	Maria Schneider	12:48
6.	"Giant Steps"	John Coltrane	7:44
7.	"Waxwing"	Maria Schneider	7:43

Source: AllMusic

== Personnel ==
- Maria Schneider – conductor, producer
- Rocky Ciccarone – trombone
- Larry Farrell – trombone
- Keith O'Quinn – trombone
- George Flynn – bass trombone
- Laurie Frink – flugelhorn, trumpet
- Greg Gisbert – flugelhorn, trumpet
- Tim Hagans – flugelhorn, trumpet
- Tony Kadleck – flugelhorn, trumpet
- Rick Margitza – tenor saxophone
- Rich Perry – tenor saxophone
- Charles Pillow – clarinet, English horn
- Tim Ries – clarinet, flute, alto and soprano saxophones
- Scott Robinson – clarinet, flute, saxophone, theremin
- Mark Vinci – clarinet, flute, alto and soprano saxophones
- Frank Kimbrough – piano
- Ben Monder – guitar
- Tony Scherr – bass guitar, double bass
- Tim Horner – drums
- Matthias Winckelmann – executive producer
- Terry Teachout – liner notes
