= Concert in the Garden =

Studio album by Maria Schneider
- Released: 2004
- Recorded: March 8–11, 2004
- Studios: Avatar, New York City
- Genres: Jazz, big band
- Length: 58:13
- Label: ArtistShare
- Producer: Maria Schneider

Maria Schneider chronology
Allégresse (2000)	Concert in the Garden (2004)	Sky Blue (2007)

Professional ratings
Review scores
Source	Rating
AllMusic	4/5 stars
The Penguin Guide to Jazz	4/4 stars

Concert in the Garden is the fourth studio album by American jazz composer Maria Schneider. The album was released in 2004 by ArtistShare and won the Grammy Award for Best Large Jazz Ensemble Album in 2005.

In 2019, the album was selected by the Library of Congress for preservation in the United States National Recording Registry for being "culturally, historically, or aesthetically significant".

== Background ==
Schneider's three previous albums were nominated for Grammy Awards, but the previous one, Allégresse, was released four years before Concert in the Garden. The delay has been attributed to the financial difficulty of recording with large groups, which are required for the music that Schneider writes.

Compared to previous albums, this album is more classical than jazz, with a greater influence of Brazilian, Spanish, and flamenco music.

== Reception ==
The JazzTimes review was mostly positive, stating, "Three Romances" and "Buleria, Solea y Rumba" "are revelatory in their complete realization", but the solos on the title track "are not strong enough to provide sufficient contrast to the piece's slow, hovering progress".

The Penguin Guide to Jazz gave the album a maximum four stars and added it to the book's Core Collection. It stated that the title-track was “a slight disappointment”, but overall the album was "the great achievement of her career so far."

== Legacy ==
The album was inducted into the National Recording Registry in 2019. In its citation, the Library of Congress stated that, alongside its musical merits, Concert in the Garden's release on ArtistShare, the first ever commercial crowdfunding website (the album was the site's first fan-funded project), as well as becoming the first-ever Grammy-winning album to be sold on the Internet instead of in stores, marked it as a trailblazer in music distribution, opening the door for ways "to respond to fan-driven demand for styles of music not otherwise readily available, while offering artists greater control over their work."

== Track listing ==
All tracks are written by Maria Schneider.

No.	Title	Length
1.	"Concert in the Garden"	11:57
2.	"Three Romances: Choro Dançado"	9:45
3.	"Three Romances: Pas de Deux"	9:02
4.	"Three Romances: Dança Ilusória"	9:05
5.	"Bulería, Soleá y Rumba"	18:24

== Personnel ==
- Maria Schneider – conductor
- Charles Pillow – alto and soprano saxophones, clarinet, flute, oboe, English horn
- Tim Ries – alto and soprano saxophones, clarinet, alto and bass flutes
- Rich Perry – tenor saxophone, flute
- Donny McCaslin – tenor and soprano saxophones, clarinet, flute
- Scott Robinson – baritone saxophone, flute, bass clarinet, contrabass clarinet
- Tony Kadleck – trumpet, flügelhorn
- Greg Gisbert – trumpet, flügelhorn
- Laurie Frink – trumpet, flügelhorn
- Ingrid Jensen – trumpet, flügelhorn
- Keith O'Quinn – trombone
- Rock Ciccarone – trombone
- Larry Farrell – trombone
- George Flynn – bass trombone, contrabass trombone
- Ben Monder – guitar
- Frank Kimbrough – piano
- Jay Anderson – double bass
- Clarence Penn – drums
- Jeff Ballard – cajón and quinto cajón on "Bulería, Soleá y Rumba" (stereo right)
- Gonzalo Grau – cajón on "Bulería, Soleá y Rumba" (stereo left)
- Gary Versace – accordion on "Concert in the Garden"
- Luciana Souza – voice on "Concert in the Garden" and "Bulería, Soleá y Rumba". Voice and pandeiro on "Choro Dançado"
- Pete McGuinness – trombone on "Pas de Deux" and "Dança Ilusória"
- Andy Middleton – tenor saxophone on "Pas de Deux" and "Dança Ilusória"
