= Donny McCaslin =

American saxophonist (born 1966)

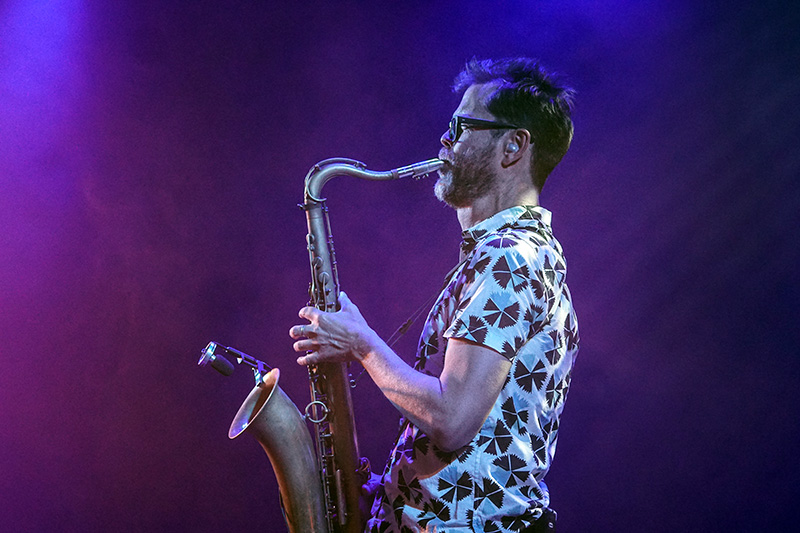
- McCaslin at Aarhus Festival, Denmark 2018

Background information
- Born: Donald Paul McCaslin; August 11, 1966 (age 60); Santa Clara, California
- Genre: Jazz
- Occupation: Musician
- Instrument: Saxophone
- Years active: 1978–present
- Labels: Naxos, Arabesque, Criss Cross Jazz, Sunnyside, Greenleaf, SkyDeck
- Website: www.donnymccaslin.com

Donald Paul McCaslin (born August 11, 1966) is an American jazz saxophonist. He has recorded over a dozen albums as a bandleader in addition to many sideman appearances, including on David Bowie's final studio album, Blackstar (2016).

== Early life ==
McCaslin was born in Santa Clara, California, on August 11, 1966. His father was a vibraphonist, and McCaslin played in his father's ensemble at the age of twelve. He had his own group in high school, which played three years at the Monterey Jazz Festival.

== Musical career ==
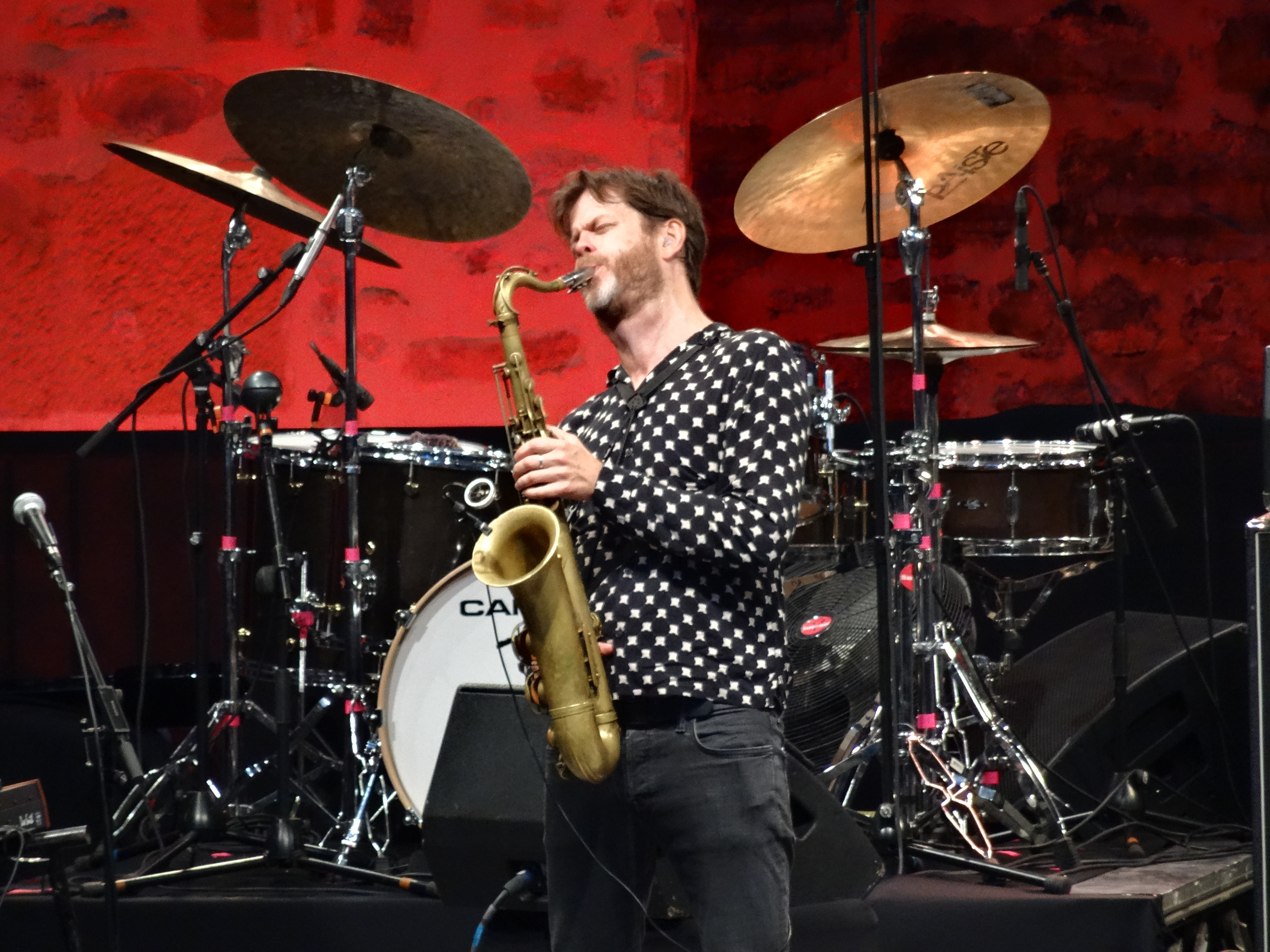
Concert at Donostia Jazz Festival 2017

In 1987, after studying at Berklee College of Music, McCaslin joined Gary Burton's group and toured the world with him for four years. In 1991 he moved to New York City and was a member of Steps Ahead.

In November 2014, McCaslin played saxophone on David Bowie's single "Sue (Or in a Season of Crime)". Subsequently he would play saxophone on Bowie's 2016 album Blackstar.

On October 14, 2016, McCaslin released Beyond Now, inspired by his experience recording Blackstar. The album features the same band that appeared on Blackstar - Tim Lefebvre on bass, Jason Lindner on keyboards, and Mark Guiliana on drums. The album includes two Bowie covers, as well as covers of MUTEMATH, Deadmau5, and The Chainsmokers, plus five original tracks.

NPR's All Songs Considered called McCaslin's "What About the Body" single "exhilarating art-rock". The album it came from, Blow, was awarded New Jazz Album of the Year by JazzJapan.

== Grammy nominations ==
- 2004: Best Jazz Instrumental Solo – "Bulería, Soleá Y Rumba" on Concert in the Garden by Maria Schneider
- 2013: Best Improvised Jazz Solo – "Stadium Jazz" on Casting for Gravity
- 2015: Best Improvised Jazz Solo – "Arbiters of Evolution" on The Thompson Fields by Maria Schneider

== Discography ==
=== As leader ===
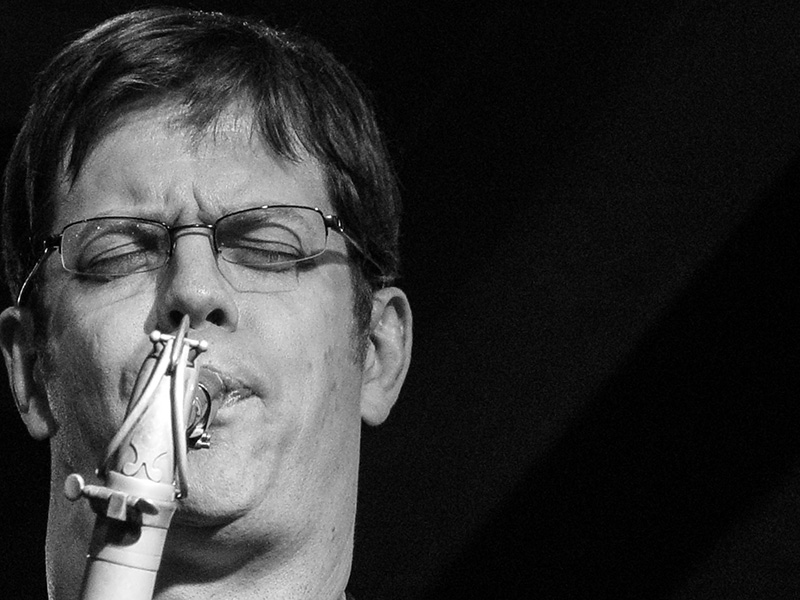
McCaslin in Aarhus, Denmark

- Exile and Discovery (Naxos, 1998)
- Seen from Above (Arabesque, 2000)
- The Way Through (Arabesque, 2003)
- Soar (Sunnyside, 2006)
- Give and Go (Criss Cross Jazz, 2006)
- In Pursuit (Sunnyside, 2007)
- Recommended Tools (Greenleaf, 2008)
- Declaration (Sunnyside, 2009)
- Perpetual Motion (Greenleaf, 2010)
- Casting for Gravity (Greenleaf, 2012)
- Fast Future (Greenleaf, 2015)
- Beyond Now (Motéma, 2016)
- Blow. (Motéma, 2018)
- Jong Metropole Orkest (Rotterdam, 2022)
- I Want More (Edition, 2023)
- Lullaby for the Lost (Edition, 2025)

=== Collaborations ===
With Lan Xang

- Lan Xang with David Binney, Scott Colley, Jeff Hirschfield (1998)
- Hidden Gardens with David Binney, Scott Colley, Kenny Wolensen (2000)

With Dave Douglas

- Meaning and Mystery (Greenleaf, 2006)
- Live at the Jazz Standard (Greenleaf, 2007)

With David Bowie

- "Sue (Or in a Season of Crime)" (ISO, 2015)
- Blackstar (ISO, 2016)
- No Plan (Columbia, 2017)

=== As a member ===
The Maria Schneider Jazz Orchestra

- Concert in the Garden (ArtistShare, 2004)
- Sky Blue (ArtistShare, 2007)
- The Thompson Fields (ArtistShare, 2015)
- Data Lords (ArtistShare, 2020)

Steps Ahead

- Vibe (NYC, 1995)

=== As sideman ===
With Art Hirahara

- Central Line (Posi-Tone, 2017)
- Sunward Bound (Posi-Tone, 2018)

With Dave Lisik

- Coming Through Slaughter: The Bolden Legend (SkyDeck Music, 2009)
- Machaut Man and a Superman Hat (Rattle, 2014)

With Nokko

- Call Me Nightlife (Epic, 1993)
- I Will Catch U (Sony, 1993)

With Enrico Pieranunzi

- Proximity (CAM Jazz, 2015)
- New Spring (CAM Jazz, 2016)

WithAlex Sipiagin

- Mirrors (Criss Cross Jazz, 2002)
- Out of the Circle (ArtistShare, 2007)

With others

- Tyler Collins, Tyler (RCA, 1992)
- Bruno Raberg, Pentimento (Boston Skyline, 1992)
- Terence Trent D'Arby, Terence Trent D'Arby's Symphony or Damn (Columbia, 1993)
- Tia Carrere, Dream (Reprise, 1993)
- Virgil Moorefield, Distractions On the Way to the King's Party (Cuneiform, 1994)
- Scott Colley, Portable Universe (Free Lance, 1996)
- Rachel Z, Room of One's Own (NYC, 1996)
- Hector Martignon, Portrait in White and Black (Candid, 1996)
- Roberta Piket, Unbroken Line (Criss Cross Jazz, 1997)
- Hector Martignon, The Foreign Affair (Candid, 1998)
- Reuben Wilson, Organ Donor (Jazzateria, 1998)
- Ken Schaphorst Big Band, Purple (Naxos, 1999)
- Luis Bonilla, Escucha! (Candid, 2000)
- New York Voices, Sing! Sing! Sing! (Concord Jazz, 2001)
- David Binney, Balance (ACT, 2002)
- Tony Monaco, Master Chops T (Summit, 2002)
- Steve Hass, Traveler (Hassbeat, 2003)
- Danilo Perez, Till Then (Verve, 2003)
- George Schuller, Round 'Bout Now (Playscape, 2003)
- Luciana Souza, North and South (Limited Edition 2003)
- Ethan Winogrand, Made in Brooklyn (Clean Feed, 2003)
- Hans Glawischnig, Common Ground (Fresh Sound, 2004)
- Bruno Raberg, Chrysalis (OrbisMusic, 2004)
- Fahir Atakoglu, If (Far & Here, 2005)
- Luis Bonilla, Trombonilla: Terminal Clarity (Now Jazz Consortium, 2005)
- Gene Ess, Sandbox and Sanctum (Simp, 2005)
- Matthias Lupri, Metalix (Summit, 2006)
- Torben Waldorff, Brilliance (Artistshare, 2006)
- Kenichi Doami, Chronicle (self-release, 2007)
- Kate McGarry, If Less Is More (Palmetto, 2008)
- George Schuller, Like Before Somewhat After (Playscape, 2008)
- Gary Versace, Outside In (Criss Cross Jazz, 2008)
- Torben Waldorff, Afterburn (Artistshare, 2008)
- Julie Lamontagne Trio, Now What (Justin Time, 2009)
- Geggie Trio, Across the Sky (Plunge, 2010)
- Bobby McFerrin, Vocabularies (Emarcy, 2010)
- Torben Waldorff, American Rock Beauty (Artistshare, 2010)
- Joel Harrison, Search (Sunnyside, 2011)
- Ethan Winogrand, Half Full (Every Good Song, 2011)
- Marshall Gilkes, Sound Stories (Alternate Side, 2012)
- Hutchinson Andrew Trio, Prairie Modern (Chronograph, 2013)
- Samo Salamon, Stretching Out (Samo, 2013)
- Antonio Sánchez, New Life (CAM Jazz, 2013)
- Thana Alexa, Ode to Heroes (Jazz Village, 2014)
- Alon Nechushtan, Venture Bound (Enja, 2014)
- Kenny Carr, Idle Talk (CDBaby, 2014)
- Pavel Wlosok Trio, Alternate Reality (CDBaby, 2014)
- Monkey House, Left (Alma, 2016)
- WinterFisch Quartet, Timeless (Jazz Sick, 2016)
- Julian & Roman Wasserfuhr, Landed in Brooklyn (ACT, 2017)
- Michael Leonhart, The Painted Lady Suite (Sunnyside, 2018)
- Sun Kil Moon, I Also Want to Die in New Orleans (Caldo Verde, 2019)
