= Scott Robinson (jazz musician) =

American jazz musician (born 1959)

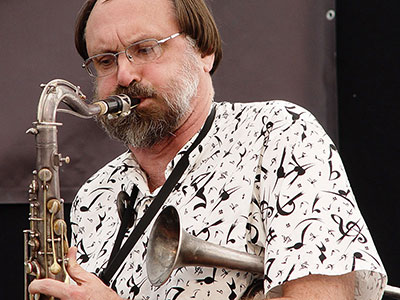
- Robinson at the 2013 Aarhus Jazz Festival

Background information
- Born: April 27, 1959 (age 67); Pompton Plains, New Jersey, U.S.
- Genres: Jazz
- Occupations: Musician; multi-instrumentalist
- Instruments: Clarinet; saxophone; trumpet; sarrusophone; ophicleide; tarogato; theremin
- Years active: 1982–present
- Labels: Arbors; ScienSonic
- Website: sciensonic.net

Scott Robinson (born April 27, 1959) is an American jazz multi-instrumentalist. Robinson is best known for his work on multiple saxophones, but he has also performed on clarinet, alto clarinet, flute, trumpet, sarrusophone, and other, more obscure instruments.

== Music career ==
The son of a piano teacher and National Geographic book editor, Robinson graduated from Berklee College of Music in 1981. The next year, he joined the college's staff, becoming its youngest faculty member.

Robinson has appeared on more than 275 LP and CD releases, including 20 under his leadership, with musicians Frank Wess, Roscoe Mitchell, Ruby Braff, Joe Lovano, Ron Carter, Paquito D'Rivera, David Bowie, Maria Schneider, Rufus Reid, Buck Clayton, and the Orchestra of St. Luke's. Four of these recordings won a Grammy Award. He has received four fellowships from the National Endowment for the Arts.

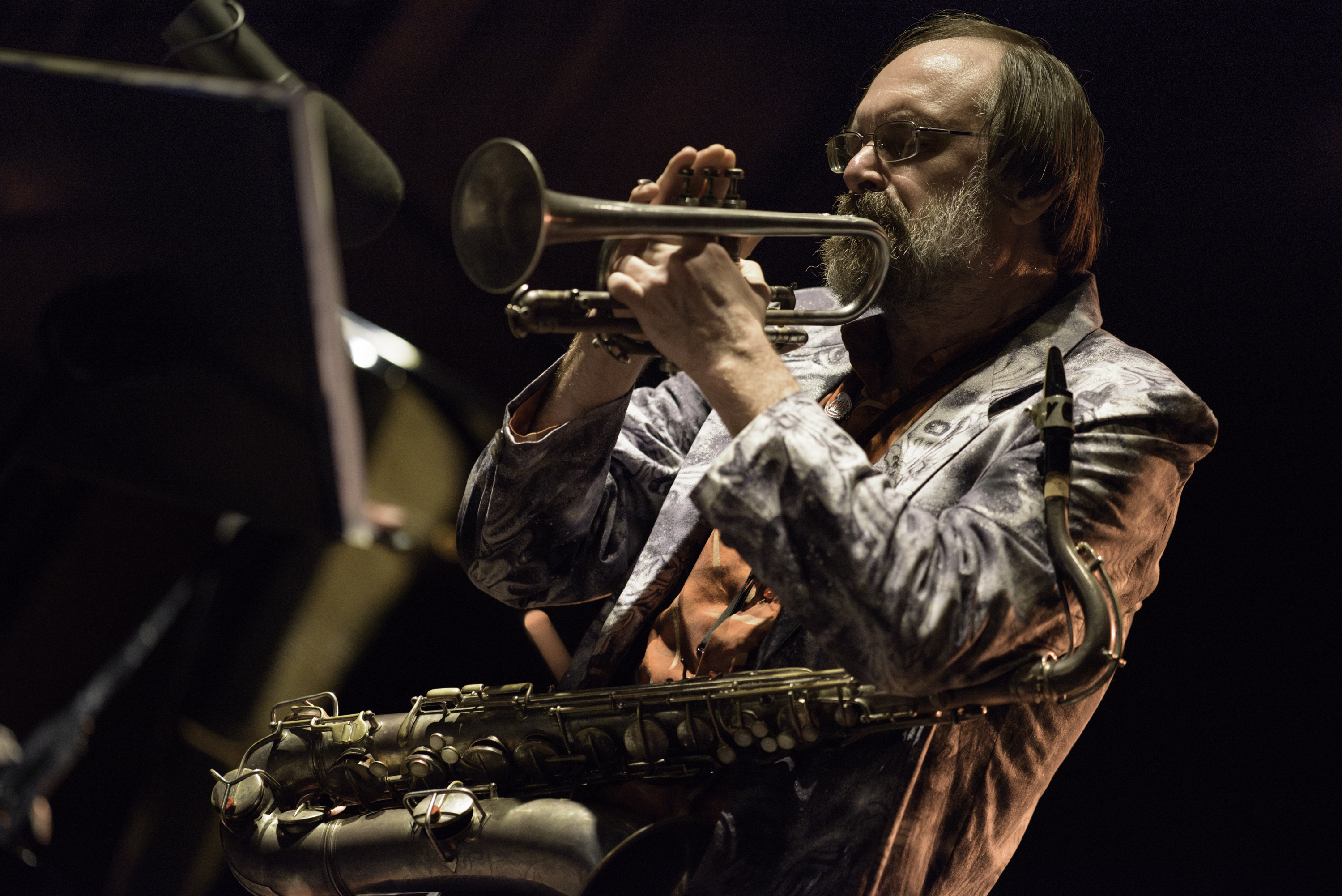
Robinson performing at the International Jazz Festival of Punta del Este in 2015

The U.S. State Department named him a jazz ambassador for the year 2001, funding a tour of West Africa in which he played the early works of Louis Armstrong. Material from these appearances was released on the album Jazz Ambassador: Scott Robinson Plays the Compositions of Louis Armstrong by Arbors Records.

Throughout his career, Robinson has worked to keep unusual and obscure instruments in the public view. For example, he has recorded an album featuring the C melody saxophone and performs with the ophicleide. He also owns and records with a vintage contrabass saxophone so rare that fewer than twenty in playable condition are known to exist.

Since 2009, he has operated his own record label, ScienSonic Laboratories.

He is not to be confused with the percussionist N. Scott Robinson.

== Select discography ==
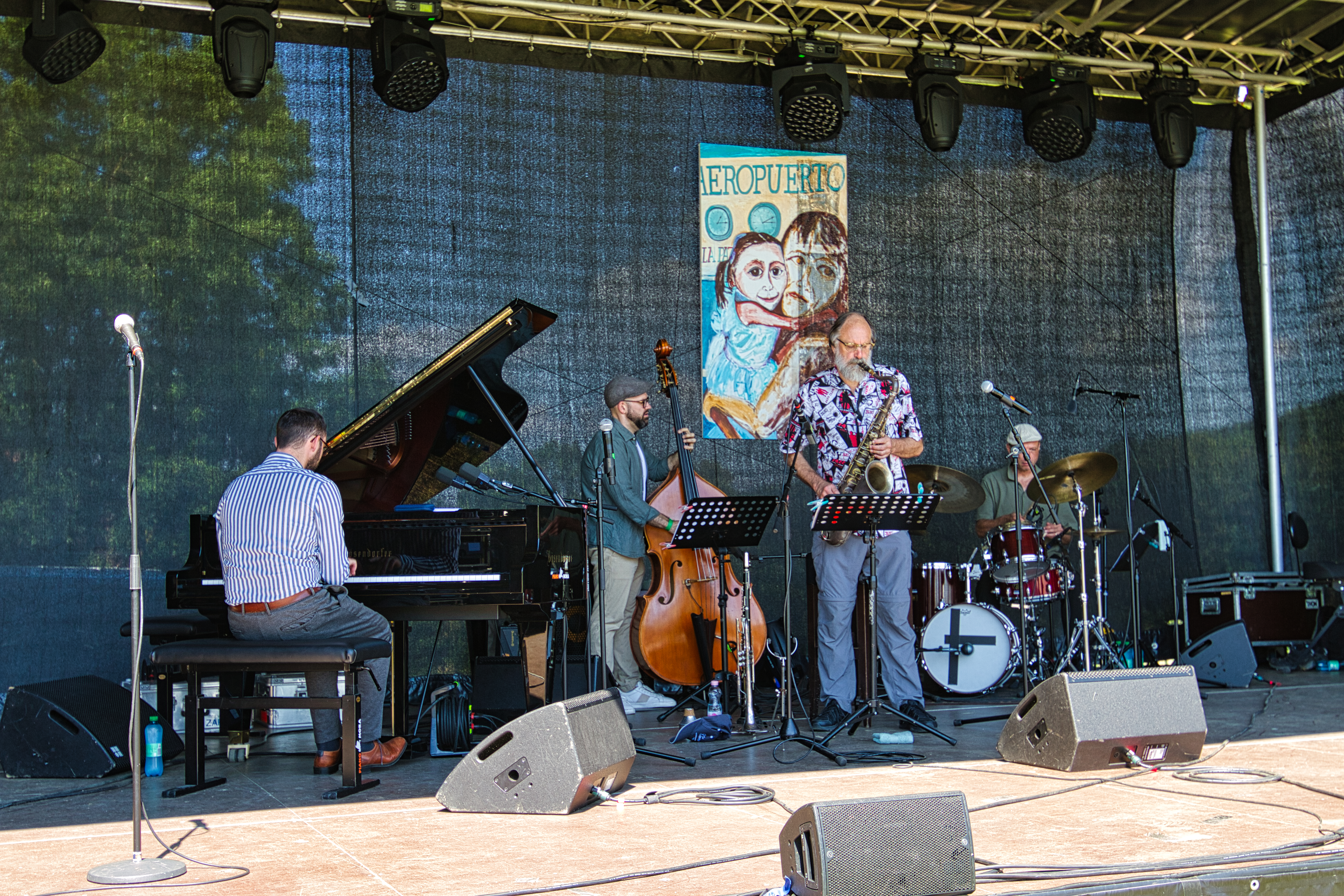
Robinson with the Matyas Bartha Trio at the INNtöne jazz festival, 2025

=== As leader/co-leader ===
- Multiple Instruments (Multijazz, 1984)
- Winds of Change (Multijazz, 1990)
- Magic Eye (Bliss, 1993)
- Thinking Big (Arbors, 1997)
- Melody from the Sky (Arbors, 2000)
- Summertime (Cube Bohemia, 2004)
- Jazz Ambassador (Arbors, 2004)
- Forever Lasting (Arbors, 2008)
- Live at Space Farms (ScienSonic, 2010)
- Nucleus (ScienSonic, 2010)
- Bronze Nemesis (Doc-tone/ScienSonic, 2012)
- Mission In Space (ScienSonic, 2014)
- ? (ScienSonic, 2015)
- Heliosonic Toneways (ScienSonic, 2017)
- Tenormore (Arbors, 2019)
- Flow States (ScienSonic, 2020)

=== As sideman or guest ===
With Toshiko Akiyoshi

- 1992: Carnegie Hall Concert
- 1994: Desert Lady / Fantasy
- 1996: Four Seasons of Morita Village
- 1998: Monopoly Game
- 1999: Tribute to Duke Ellington
- 2001: Hiroshima – Rising from the Abyss
- 2004: Last Live in Blue Note Tokyo

With Ruby Braff

- 1997: Ruby Braff Remembers Louis Armstrong: Being With You
- 2002: Variety Is the Spice of Braff
- 2010: Our Love Is Here to Stay

With John Fedchock

- 1992: New York Big Band
- 1998: On the Edge
- 2002: No Nonsense

With Marty Grosz

- 1994: Keep a Song in Your Soul
- 1996: The Rhythm for Sale
- 2005: Chasin' the Spots
- 2006: Marty Grosz and His Hot Combination
- 2009: Hot Winds: The Classic Sessions
- 2012: The James P. Johnson Songbook

With Keith Ingham

- 1994: The Keith Ingham New York 9, Vol. 1
- 1994: The Keith Ingham New York 9, Vol. 2
- 1998: A Mellow Bit of Rhythm
- 1999: A Star Dust Melody
- 2001: Keith Ingham New York 9, Vol. 3

With Frank Kimbrough

- 2018: Monk's Dreams: The Complete Compositions of Thelonious Sphere Monk (Sunnyside)

With Frank Mantooth

- 1989: Suite Tooth
- 1993: Dangerous Precedent
- 1999: Miracle

With Bob Mintzer

- 1990: The Art of the Big Band
- 2000: Homage to Count Basie
- 2006: Old School New Lessons

With John Pizzarelli

- 1991: All of Me
- 1993: Naturally
- 1994: New Standards
- 1997: Our Love Is Here to Stay

With the Joe Roccisano Orchestra

- Leave Your Mind Behind (Landmark, 1995)

With Randy Sandke

- 1990: Stampede
- 1993: The Bix Beiderbecke Era
- 1994: Chase
- 1995: Calling All Cats
- 2000: Re-Discovered Louis & Bix
- 2002: Randy Sandke Meets Bix Beiderbecke
- 2002: Inside Out
- 2005: Outside In

With Maria Schneider

- 1992: Evanescence
- 1995: Coming About
- 2000: Allegresse
- 2000: Days of Wine and Roses – Live at the Jazz Standard
- 2004: Concert in the Garden
- 2013: Winter Morning Walks
- 2015: The Thompson Fields
- 2020: Data Lords

With John Sheridan

- 2005: Easy as It Gets
- 2007: Swing Is Still the King
- 2010: Hooray for Christmas!

With others

- 1985: Live at Chan's, Rebecca Parris
- 1993: Saxophone Mosaic, Gary Smulyan
- 1993: Tryin' to Make My Blues Turn Green, Frank Wess
- 1993: What Matters Most, Tom Postilio
- 1994: Black Brown & Beige, Louie Bellson
- 1994: Caecilie Norby, Cæcilie Norby
- 1994: I Saw Stars, Rebecca Kilgore
- 1996: Bufadora Blow-Up, Bob Wilber
- 1996: Look What I Found, Daryl Sherman
- 1996: Strings Attached, Peter Ecklund
- 1997: Live at MCG, Paquito D'Rivera
- 1997: Song for My Mother, Walt Weiskopf
- 1999: Last Swing of the Century, Ken Peplowski
- 1999: Joyful Noise: A Tribute to Duke Ellington, Don Sebesky
- 1999: New Works Celebration, Bob Brookmeyer
- 1999: Out of This World, Loren Schoenberg
- 2000: Being a Bear: Jazz for the Whole Family, Dan Barrett
- 2000: Noumena, Frank Kimbrough
- 2000: Sultry Serenade, James Chirillo
- 2001: Ballad Essentials, Carol Sloane
- 2001: Black Dahlia, Bob Belden
- 2001: Dear Louis, Nicholas Payton
- 2001: Group Therapy, Jim McNeely
- 2001: L' Instant d'Apres, David Linx
- 2001: Play It Cool, Lea DeLaria
- 2001: Sweet & Lowdown, Dave Van Ronk
- 2003: On This Day at the Vanguard, Joe Lovano
- 2006: Tiger by the Tail, George Gruntz
- 2011: Ron Carter's Great Big Band, Ron Carter
- 2013: Joyride, Cynthia Sayer
- 2014: Nothing Has Changed, David Bowie
- 2014: Quiet Pride: The Elizabeth Catlett Project, Rufus Reid
- 2018: Monk's Dreams: The Complete Compositions of Thelonious Sphere Monk (Sunnyside, 2018), Frank Kimbrough
