= Data Lords =

Studio album by Maria Schneider Orchestra
- Released: July 24, 2020
- Recorded: August 30 – September 2, 2019
- Studios: Oktaven Audio, Mount Vernon, New York
- Genres: Jazz, big band
- Length: 96:00
- Label: ArtistShare
- Producers: Brian Camelio, Maria Schneider, Ryan Truesdell

Maria Schneider Orchestra chronology
The Thompson Fields (2015)	Data Lords (2020)

Data Lords is a large-ensemble jazz album by the Maria Schneider Orchestra that was released in 2020.

== Summary ==
The tracks of the album are thematically organized in two sections, which the liner notes call "a story of two worlds" and are much like a two-disk release. The two sections are named "The Digital World" and "The Natural World".

== Accolades ==
- 2021 - Finalist for the Pulitzer Prize for Music
- 2021 - Grammy Award for Best Large Jazz Ensemble Album
- 2021 - The track "Sputnik" won the Grammy Award for Best Instrumental Composition
- 2021 - Le Grand Prix de l’Académie du Jazz for Best Record of the Year

== Track listing ==
All tracks are written by Maria Schneider.

The Digital World
No.	Title	Length
1.	"A World Lost"	9:42
2.	"Don't Be Evil"	13:38
3.	"CQ CQ, Is Anybody There?"	10:18
4.	"Sputnik"	8:10
5.	"Data Lords"	11:06

The Natural World
No.	Title	Length
6.	"Sanzenin"	5:46
7.	"Stone Song"	5:45
8.	"Look Up"	9:05
9.	"Braided Together"	3:59
10.	"Bluebird"	11:11
11.	"The Sun Waited For Me"	7:22

== Personnel ==
- Greg Gisbert – trumpet, flügelhorn
- Tony Kadleck – trumpet, flügelhorn
- Nadje Noordhuis – trumpet, flügelhorn
- Mike Rodriguez – trumpet, flügelhorn
- Marshall Gilkes – trombone
- Ryan Keberle – trombone
- Keith O'Quinn – trombone
- George Flynn – bass trombone
- Dave Pietro – alto saxophone, clarinet, piccolo, flute
- Steve Wilson – alto saxophone, soprano saxophone, clarinet, flute
- Donny McCaslin – tenor saxophone, flute
- Rich Perry – tenor saxophone
- Scott Robinson – baritone, Bb, bass & contrabass clarinets, muson
- Gary Versace – accordion
- Frank Kimbrough – piano
- Ben Monder – guitar
- Jay Anderson – bass
- Johnathan Blake – drums, percussion

== Additional Credits ==
- Producer: Brian Camelio, Maria Schneider, Ryan Truesdell
- Associate Producer: Zachary Bornheimer
- Engineering: Brian Montgomery, assisted by Charles Mueller and Edwin Huet
- Trumpet electronics programming on "CQ CQ, Is Anybody There?": Michael Lenssen
- Recording production assistance: Eunha So
- Mixing: Brian Montgomery and Maria Schneider
- Mastering: Gene Paul at G&J Audio, and Nate Wood

Package Design:

- Illustration: Aaron Horkey
- Graphic design: Cheri Dorr
- Print production: Franklin Press, Inc.
- Session photography: Briene Lermitte
- Video documentation on ArtistShare: Marie Le Claire assisted by Erin Harper
