= Brian Camelio =

Brian Louis Camelio
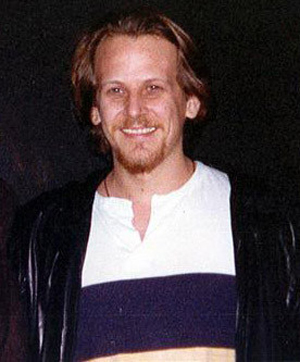

Background information
- Occupations: Record producer, songwriter, musician, Industry creation expert, Founder/CEO ArtistShare inc., entrepreneur
- Years active: 1974–present
- Website: www.briancamelio.com

Brian Louis Camelio is an American record producer, musician, entrepreneur, founder of ArtistShare and senior consultant at The Camelio Group.

Camelio has been referred to as the father of crowdfunding, and "a post-modern Ahmet Ertegun" according to Bloomberg News. In 2005, he was the subject of a chapter in in The Big Moo: Stop Trying to be Perfect and Start Being Remarkable titled "The One Thing You Can't Download" by entrepreneur and author Seth Godin. He has been a speaker or panelist at the Judge Business School at Cambridge University, Midem, The Grammy Foundation at NARAS, ASCAP, NYU Law School, Pew Center for Arts & Heritage, The Songwriters hall of fame and The Future of Music Coalition.

He was a member of the core faculty of The New School for Jazz and Contemporary Music, an online Digital Marketing instructor for the Eastman School of Music and has been a columnist for All About Jazz since 2010.

== Music career ==
Camelio, who grew up in Boston, began his music performance career at the age of nine and continued to pursue music at Clark University as a composition major. After finishing his music degree at the University of Vermont with a concentration in orchestral composition, he spent 15 years as a professional touring musician, composer and producer according to Celebrity Access.

Since founding ArtistShare, he has produced seven albums for jazz guitarist and NEA Jazzmaster Jim Hall including Hemispheres, the 2008 collaboration with Bill Frisell, and Conversations (2010) with Joey Baron as well as composer Maria Schneider. He has also worked with Renée Fleming, Placido Domingo, Trey Anastasio, Phish, Barbara Feldon among others.

In March 2021, Camelio received a Grammy award for his work as producer on the album Data Lords by Maria Schneider.

== Business career ==
After teaching himself computer programming, Camelio started his first internet business in 1998, an online fundraising portal for non-profit groups. The business was not a success but the lessons learned led him to projects geared more towards technology. Around this time he also authored and published college music theory textbook named Finale Made Easy.

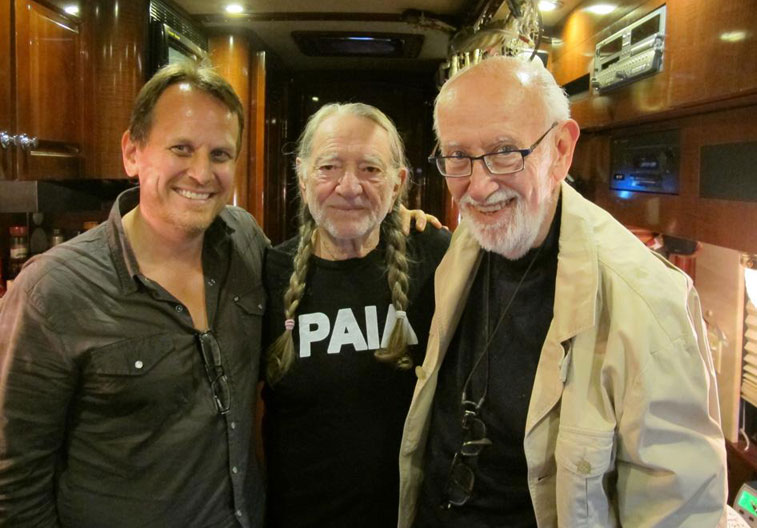
Brian Camelio with singer Willie Nelson and Blue Note Records President Bruce Lundvall on Willie Nelson's tour bus.

In 2000 or 2001, Camelio founded ArtistShare. ArtistShare is recognized as the world's first crowdfunding website. It also operates as a record label and business model for creative artists, which enables them to fund their projects by allowing the general public to directly finance, watch the creative process, and in most cases gain access to extra material from an artist. In 2004, the first ArtistShare release won a Grammy for "Best Large Jazz Ensemble Recording" and became the first album ever to win a Grammy that was not available in retail stores. This is the moment Camelio describes as being his most memorable industry experience.

In a 2004 study by Cathy Allison, a technology expert engaged by the Canadian Heritage’s Copyright Policy Branch "to capture a 'snapshot' of current business models and technologies, and to contemplate possible future scenarios regarding the control and compensation for use of music", Camelio is quoted as saying: "ArtistShare is the only viable solution that I can see. With the advent of the latest technology, it is becoming increasingly clear that there needs to be a fundamental shift in how artists do business. That shift involves the expansion of the product offered and a completely different payment schedule. ArtistShare will provide the platform."

The Jazz Review stated in January 2011 that Camelio "now may be considered visionary for perceiving the direction that the distribution of musical recordings was headed in 2001."

In May 2013, ArtistShare partnered with Blue Note Records to form a collaboration titled 'Blue Note/ArtistShare'. The Blue Note/ArtistShare collaboration was forged by Camelio, Bruce Lundvall, and Don Was, President of Blue Note Records.

== Selected discography ==
- 1987: "Generations" – Jon Gailmor (Bass, Guitar)
- 1997: "Textures" – Jim Hall (Music Preparation)
- 1998: "By Arrangement" – Jim Hall (Music Preparation)
- 2002: "Trio of One" – Sean Harkness (Guitar, Composer)
- 2002: "Initial Wisdom" – Scott Colley (Composer)
- 2004: "Magic Meeting" – Jim Hall (Producer)
- 2005: "Free Association" – Jim Hall and Geoffrey Keezer (Producer)
- 2008: "Hemispheres" – Jim Hall and Bill Frisell (Producer)
- 2010: "Conversations" – Jim Hall and Joey Baron (Producer)
- 2011: "Living Alone And Loving It" (audio book) – Barbara Feldon (Producer)
- 2012: "Live At Birdland" – Jim Hall (Producer)
- 2012: "Jim Hall Live! – Vol. 2-4" – Jim Hall (Producer)
- 2013: "Newport Jazz Gala!" – Dianne Reeves, Jason Moran, Anat Cohen, Bill Frisell, Edmar Castaneda, Ingrid Jensen, Lionel Loueke, Steve Wilson, and Lewis Nash (Producer)
- 2016: "Inspired" – John Abercrombie, Rale Micic, Peter Bernstein, Lage Lund (Producer)
- 2016: "Valse Hot" – Jim Hall and Red Mitchell (Producer)
- 2017: "With a song in my heart" – Jane Hall and Ed Bickert (Producer)
- 2018: "Stories and Occasional Lies" – Chip Wilson (Producer, Performer)
- 2019: "The Essential Maria Schneider" – Maria Schneider (Producer)
- 2020: "Data Lords" – Maria Schneider Orchestra (Producer)
- 2022: "Uniquities" – Jim Hall (Producer)
- 2023: "By Request – The Diane Warren Songbook Vol. 1" – Jonathan Antoine and Diane Warren (Executive Producer)
- 2023: "Family Tree" – John Clayton and Houston Person (Producer)
- 2024: "Decades" – Maria Schneider Orchestra (Producer)
- 2025: "Halellujah" – Renée Fleming (Production, guitar, piano)
- 2026: "American Crow" – Maria Schneider Orchestra (Producer)
- 2026: "Two-O-Duo" – John Clayton featuring René Marie and Gerald Clayton (Producer)

== Awards ==
=== Grammy Awards ===
Year	Nominee / Work	Award	Role	Result
63rd Annual Grammy Awards	Maria Schneider – "Data Lords"	Best Large Jazz Ensemble Album	Producer	Won

=== Choc de l'année Awards (France) ===
Award Year	Nominee / Work	Award	Role	Result
2005	Jim Hall - "Magic Meeting"	Choc de l'année Award	Producer	Won
2006	Jim Hall / Geoffrey Keezer – "Free Association"	Choc de l'année Award	Producer	Won

=== Other awards ===
- ASCAP Young Composer's Grant – 1986
- VCA Grant – 1986
- Mayor's Peace Prize - Burlington, Vt. for orchestral composition – 1989
