= Communion (John Patitucci album) =

Studio album by John Patitucci
- Released: August 14, 2001
- Recorded: February – March 2001
- Genre: Jazz fusion
- Length: 54:31
- Label: Concord
- Producer: John Patitucci

John Patitucci chronology
Imprint (2000)	Communion (2001)	Songs, Stories & Spirituals (2003)

Communion is an album by jazz bassist John Patitucci, released in 2001.

== Background ==
Patitucci had released three albums for Concord Records before this one.

== Music and recording ==
The album's 10 tracks featured a total of 18 musicians. A variety of material is covered, including "On the balladic title track, he writes a supple arrangement for string quartet, and elsewhere leans toward Brazil (as on the engaging, rapid-fire "Choro Luoco", dedicated to Hermeto Pascoal) and other Latin elements (i.e., the catchy, sambaesque "Bariloche")." Mal Waldron's "Soul Eyes" is played as a duet with pianist Brad Mehldau.

== Reception ==
Professional ratings
Review scores
Source	Rating
AllMusic	2.5/5 stars
All About Jazz	(favorable)

The AllMusic reviewer commented that "Some of the cuts are less than memorable ("Isabella", "Misterioso"), and the stronger ones succeed more in terms of orchestration than melody."

== Track listing ==
All tracks are written by John Patitucci except where noted.

No.	Title	Length
1.	"Bariloche"	4:44
2.	"Calabria"	6:19
3.	"Choro Luoco"	4:40
4.	"Isabella"	8:02
5.	"Communion"	6:44
6.	"Misterioso" (Thelonious Monk)	4:19
7.	"Valentine"	6:10
8.	"The Sower"	7:05
9.	"Soul Eyes" (Mal Waldron)	3:44
10.	"Bohemia After Dark" (Oscar Pettiford)	2:44

== Personnel ==
- John Patitucci – bass guitar, double bass
- Branford Marsalis – soprano sax
- Joe Lovano – tenor sax
- Chris Potter – tenor sax, soprano sax
- Tim Ries – clarinet, flute
- Brad Mehldau – piano
- Bruce Barth – piano
- Edward Simon – piano
- Brian Blade – drums
- Horacio Hernández – drums
- Valtinho Anastacio – percussion
- Duduka da Fonseca – percussion
- Marc Quiñones – percussion, conga
- Luciana Souza – vocals
- Elizabeth Lim-Dutton – violin
- Richard Rood – violin
- Lawrence Dutton – viola
- Sachi Patitucci – cello

Production

- John Patitucci – producer
- Joe Barbaria – engineer, mixing
- Allan Tucker – mastering
