= Flow States =

Studio album by Marshall Allen, Roscoe Mitchell, Milford Graves, and Scott Robinson
- Released: 2020
- Recorded: April 21, 2015
- Studio: ScienSonic Laboratories, Teaneck, New Jersey
- Genre: Free jazz
- Label: ScienSonic; SS12

Flow States is an album by reed players Marshall Allen, Roscoe Mitchell, Scott Robinson, drummer Milford Graves, Jason Alanis, and Ian Randolph. It was recorded at ScienSonic Laboratories in Teaneck, New Jersey on April 21, 2015, and was released in 2020 by the ScienSonic label. The album captured the first occasion on which Mitchell played with either Allen or Graves. It was recorded one day after the ScienSonic session that produced the album Heliosonic Toneways, on which both Allen and Robinson performed.

== Reception ==
Professional ratings
Review scores
Source	Rating
DownBeat	4/5 stars

In a review for DownBeat, Ivana Ng called the album "a compact yet unrelenting set of expansive improvisations," and commented: "Flow States finds the quartet oscillating between forceful explorations and sparse, meditative musings, while seamlessly weaving in bebop, funk and more avant-garde concepts... The band's collaboration throughout feels organic and well-balanced, with each musician afforded the proper space to explore fringe concepts... By its conclusion, the band reaches a full-on flow state of boundless improvisation and unbridled creative energy"

Writing for The New York City Jazz Record, Kyle Oleksiuk described the album as "strong" and "adventurous," and depicted the bulk of the music as "a high-energy free jazz atmospheric fugue (in the 'fugue state' sense), worthy of addition to the browsing music of any adventurous record store." He concluded: "This section is relatively standard; it is the kind of thing that most free jazz fans will feel they've heard a thousand times before but, like the blues, one never gets tired of hearing it."

== Track listing ==
1. "Vortex State" – 15:16
2. "Dream State" – 10:47
3. "Transition State" – 7:55
4. "Steady State" – 5:53
5. "Plasma State" – 6:23
6. "Altered State" – 6:18
7. "Variable State" – 6:12
8. "Flow State" – 9:40

== Personnel ==
- Marshall Allen – reeds
- Roscoe Mitchell – reeds
- Scott Robinson – reeds
- Milford Graves – drums
