= Annie Booth =

American jazz pianist and educator

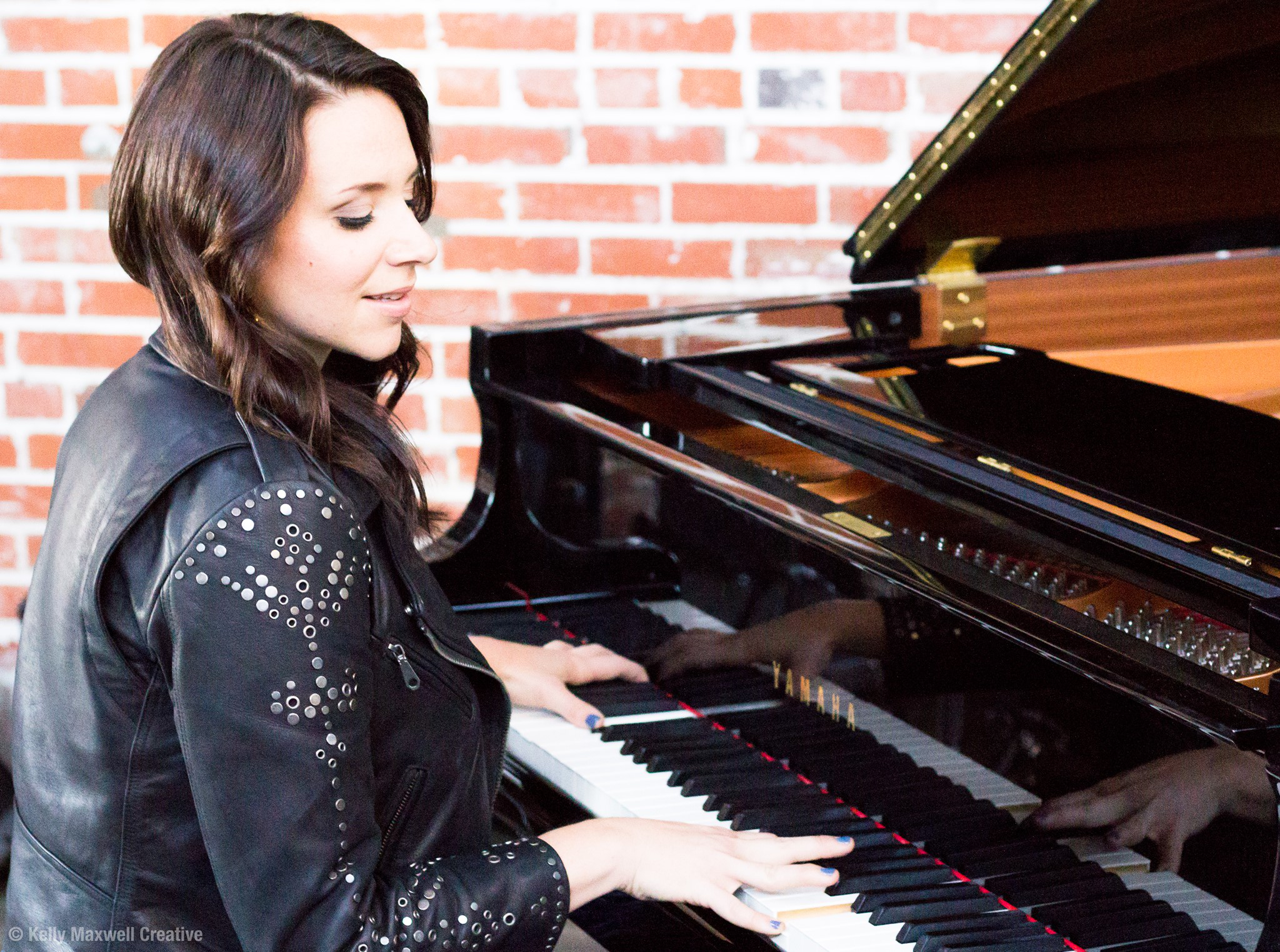
- Annie Booth - Composer, Arranger, Jazz Pianist and Educator

Background information
- Origin: Denver, Colorado USA
- Instruments: Composer, arranger, piano, accordion and keyboards.
- Website: www.annieboothmusic.com

Annie Booth (US) (born 1989) is an American jazz pianist and educator.

== Early life and education ==
From the age of 16, Booth studied with jazz organist Pat Bianchi, pianist Jeff Jenkins and Art Lande. She studied at the Colorado Conservatory for the Jazz Arts and went on to the Thompson Jazz Studies Program at the University of Colorado Boulder.

== Career ==
In 2016, Booth toured Mexico with the New York Jazz All Stars - Greg Gisbert Quartet (sponsored by Jazz at Lincoln Center) that included musicians Greg Gisbert, Tommy Campbell, and Mike Boone (side artist for Buddy Rich and John Swana). She has arranged, recorded and performed with Yamaha Artist, Bob Montgomery (Clark Terry big band, Nancy Wilson, Tony Bennett and Quincy Jones). She has also opened for jazz pianist, Joey Alexander.

Her trio has performed and toured in North America, and has appeared at jazz clubs and festivals including the South by Southwest festival in 2017 and as the first artist-in-residence at Nocturne Jazz & Supper Club. In 2015 she was featured as part of KUVO's (89.3 FM) 30 Under 30 program.

Booth has performed on movie soundtracks, such as Our Souls at Night (2017). In 2019 she was selected for the "2020 Young Composer" Showcase by the Jazz Education Network and her composition Jolly Beach was performed by The U.S. Navy Band Commodores at the 2020 conference in New Orleans, LA.

Since 2015, Booth has worked with the Colorado Conservatory for the Jazz Arts (CCJA), a non-profit jazz education outreach organization for middle and high school students. In 2017, she created the SheBop jazz program, a series of jazz workshops and clinics for young women, ages 10–18.

Booth is an assistant professor of jazz studies in the Thompson Jazz Studies Program at the University of Colorado Boulder.

Brava Jazz Publishing, a collaboration between Booth and Alan Baylock, launched in 2023 with a catalog of big band music for all ability levels from middle school to professional, composed and/or arranged by women.

== Awards ==
Booth was named "Best In Denver - Jazz" from Westword in 2015, 2016 and 2017.

Booth was awarded the 2017 Herb Alpert Young Jazz Composer Award and the 2017 ASCAP Foundation Phoebe Jacobs Prize by the American Society of Composers, Authors and Publishers (ASCAP).

Booth was chosen by Westword Magazine as one of Denver's top 10 jazz musicians in 2021.

In 2020, Booth was the recipient of the Downbeat Jazz Magazine "Graduate College Outstanding Performance" award.

== Discography ==
=== As leader ===
- Now We're Talkin' Christmas (2025)
- Here, There and Everywhere (2024)
- Flowers of Evil (2023)
- Alpenglow (2022)
- The Annie Booth Trio with Max Wellman (2018)
- Abundance (with Greg Gisbert, 2017)
- Festive (2016)
- Wanderlust (Dazzle Records, 2014)

=== As side artist ===
- Bob Montgomery - La Familia: The Music of Bob Montgomery
- Tom Gershwin - Live at Mighty Fine
- Jason Klobnak - New Chapter
- Ryan Fourt - Big Slick
- Jeff Riley - Jazz Suite
- Paul Mullikin - Time Is Now
