= Joe Roccisano =

American jazz musician (1939–1997)

Joseph Lucian Roccisano (October 15, 1939 in Springfield, Massachusetts – November 9, 1997) was an American jazz saxophonist and arranger.

== Career ==
Roccisano received his bachelor's degree in music education from SUNY-Potsdam in 1963. In 1964 he played in the Tommy Dorsey orchestra under Sam Donahue, then moved to Los Angeles, where he played with Don Ellis (1966–68), Ray Charles (1967-68), Louie Bellson, Lew Tabackin, Toshiko Akiyoshi, Terry Gibbs, Don Menza, Bill Holman, and Don Rader. He assembled the 15-piece ensemble Rocbop in 1976 and played in the Capp-Pierce Juggernaut in 1981. He later formed his own big band, the Joe Roccisano Orchestra, which released two albums during the 1990s. The musicians joining him in this band included Bill Charlap, Bud Burridge, Jack Stuckey, Franck Amsallem, James E. Pugh, John Basile, Ken Hitchcock, Lou Marini, Matt Finders, Robert Millikan, Scott Lee, Terry Clarke, Tim Ries, Tom Harrell, Scott Robinson, and Greg Gisbert.

Roccisano was an arranger for with Ellis, Bellson, Doc Severinsen, and Woody Herman. He scored the tune "Green Earrings" on the 1978 Herman album Chick, Donald, Walter, and Woodrow and was nominated for a Grammy Award for the arrangement. He composed "Tenors of the Time", a tune recorded by Pete Christlieb and Warne Marsh.

== Discography ==
=== As leader ===
- The Shape I'm In (Landmark, 1993)
- Leave Your Mind Behind (Landmark, 1995)
- Nonet (Double-Time, 1998)

=== As sideman ===
With Louie Bellson

- Don't Stop Now (Bosco, 1984)
- Louie Bellson and His Jazz Orchestra (MusicMasters, 1987)
- Hot (MusicMasters, 1988)
- East Side Suite (MusicMasters, 1989)
- Airmail Special (MusicMasters, 1990)
- Live from New York (Telarc, 1994)

With Don Ellis

- Electric Bath (Columbia, 1967)
- Live in 3 2-3/4 Time (Pacific Jazz, 1966)
- Shock Treatment (Columbia, 1968)

With others

- Toshiko Akiyoshi & Lew Tabackin, Long Yellow Road (RCA, 1975)
- Bob Crewe, Street Talk (Elektra, 1976)
- The Capp-Pierce Orchestra, Juggernaut Strikes Again! (Concord Jazz, 1982)
- The Manhattan Transfer, Pastiche (Atlantic, 1978)
- Walter Murphy, Discosymphony (New York, 1979)
- David Oliver, Rain Fire (Mercury, 1979)
- Harry Partch, Delusion of the Fury (Innova/Sony, 1999)
- Don Rader, Polluted Tears (DRM, 1973)
