= Leave Your Mind Behind =

Studio album by Joe Roccisano Orchestra
- Released: 1995
- Recorded: November–December, 1994
- Studio: Sony Studios, New York, NY
- Genre: Jazz
- Length: 67:38
- Label: Landmark; LCD 1533
- Producer: Alan Foust, Joe Roccisano

Joe Roccisano chronology
The Shape I'm In (1993)	Leave Your Mind Behind (1995)	Nonet (1994)

Leave Your Mind Behind is an album by the Joe Roccisano Orchestra which was released on Orrin Keepnews' Landmark label in 1995.

== Reception ==
Professional ratings
Review scores
Source	Rating
AllMusic	3/5 stars

The AllMusic review by Alex Henderson stated "Joe Roccisano was never a huge name in the jazz world, nor was he ever an innovator. He was, however, a hard-swinging saxman who had no problem leading a big band. One of Roccisano's big-band recordings came in 1994 when he did all of the arranging and conducting on Leave Your Mind Behind. There aren't a lot of surprises on this hard bop CD, and the charts are pretty conventional. Still, it's enjoyable and honest. ... the album plays it safe and does so with decent, if unremarkable, results".

== Track listing ==
All compositions by Joe Roccisano except where noted

1. "The Fax of Life" – 6:24
2. "Quill" (Phil Woods) – 6:56
3. "'Round Midnight" (Thelonious Monk, Cootie Williams, Bernie Hanighen) – 7:11
4. "The Goodbye Look" (Donald Fagen) – 5:05
5. "It Seem Like Yesterday" – 6:10
6. "Throw Back the Little Ones" (Walter Becker, Fagen) – 6:29
7. "Changes" – 6:06
8. "Avarice" – 4:29
9. "Take Five" (Paul Desmond) – 4:11
10. "Leave Your Mind Behind" – 6:41
11. "Medley: Adiós Nonino/La Muerta del Angel" (Astor Piazzolla) – 7:56

== Personnel ==
- Joe Roccisano - alto saxophone, soprano saxophone, Yamaha WX 11, arranger, conductor
- Bob Millikan – lead trumpet, flugelhorn
- Greg Gisbert, Tony Kadleck – trumpet, flugelhorn
- Jim Pugh – trombone
- David Taylor – bass trombone
- Lou Marini – alto saxophone, soprano saxophone, flute
- Scott Robinson – tenor saxophone, soprano saxophone, flute, clarinet
- Tim Ries – tenor saxophone, soprano saxophone, flute
- Jack Stuckey – baritone saxophone, bass clarinet
- Bill Charlap – piano
- Doug Weiss – bass
- Terry Clarke – drums
- John Kaye – percussion
