= The Thompson Fields =

Studio album by Maria Schneider Orchestra
- Released: June 22, 2015
- Recorded: August 2014
- Studios: Avatar, New York City
- Genres: Jazz, big band
- Length: 77:21
- Label: ArtistShare
- Producers: Maria Schneider, Ryan Truesdell

Maria Schneider Orchestra chronology
Winter Morning Walks (2013)	The Thompson Fields (2015)	Data Lords (2020)

Professional ratings
Review scores
Source	Rating
All About Jazz	5/5 stars
The Daily Telegraph	5/5 stars
The Guardian	5/5 stars
The Irish Times	4/5 stars

The Thompson Fields is an album by the Maria Schneider Orchestra that won the Grammy Award for Best Large Jazz Ensemble Album in 2017. Schneider was the composer, conductor, and co-producer of the autobiographical work. The title comes from the Minnesota farm where she was raised.

The Thompson Fields comes with over fifty pages of liner notes containing photographs, drawings, and Schneider's thoughts about nature.

== Critical reception ==
In Stereo Review magazine, music critic Fred Kaplan called the album a masterpiece and ranked Schneider with big band composers Duke Ellington, Billy Strayhorn, and Gil Evans, adding that she worked as an assistant to Evans and Bob Brookmeyer early in her career. Critic Kevin Whitehead of NPR praised the album, though he said the album's grandeur could get "too purple". At All About Jazz, Dan Bilawsky called the album "awe-inspiring". He said that the quotation from Theodore Roosevelt on the liner notes fits much of Schneider's music: "'There is nothing more practical in the end than the preservation of beauty, than the preservation of anything that appeals to the higher emotions in mankind.'" In The New York Times, Nate Chinen wrote that she is borrowing methods used by Duke Ellington and Wynton Marsalis but that she has her own way of "using timbre and harmony to bring a tactile presence to the dimensions of sound." Chinen added that her orchestra planned to perform this pastoral composition at the Birdland club in New York City. Doug Ramsey at Arts Journal called The Thompson Fields a suite because of "its unity of style and its mood of reflection."

In the UK, Ivan Hewett of The Daily Telegraph comments on the importance of the liner notes, the bird paintings by Audubon, and how the music mimics the Minnesota landscape's "quality of being both huge and intimate." At The Guardian, John Fordham commented that, although The Thompson Fields is reflective, it also swings.

The Thompson Fields won best jazz album of the year in the Readers' Poll at Down Beat magazine.

== Track listing ==
All tracks are written by Maria Schneider.

No.	Title	Length
1.	"Walking by Flashlight"	5:01
2.	"The Monarch and the Milkweed"	12:07
3.	"Arbiters of Evolution"	13:59
4.	"The Thompson Fields"	10:00
5.	"Home"	7:46
6.	"Nimbus"	9:29
7.	"A Potter's Song"	5:29
8.	"Lembrança"	13:30

On-line purchase download bonus tracks
No.	Title	Length
9.	"Lembra de Mim" (By Ivan Lins)	6:24
10.	"Dance You Monster To My Soft Song"	7:04

Source: Allmusic

"A Potter's Song" was dedicated to the memory of Laurie Frink, a trumpet player who had performed on all previous albums by the Maria Schneider Orchestra.

== Personnel ==
- Dave Pietro – alto saxophone, clarinet, piccolo, flute, alto flute, bass flute
- Steve Wilson – alto saxophone, soprano saxophone, clarinet, flute, alto flute
- Rich Perry – tenor saxophone, flute
- Donny McCaslin – tenor saxophone, clarinet
- Scott Robinson – baritone saxophone, clarinet, bass clarinet
- Greg Gisbert – trumpet, flügelhorn
- Augie Haas – trumpet, flügelhorn
- Tony Kadleck – trumpet, flügelhorn
- Mike Rodriguez – trumpet, flügelhorn
- Marshall Gilkes – trombone
- Ryan Keberle – trombone
- Keith O'Quinn – trombone
- George Flynn – bass trombone, contrabass trombone
- Frank Kimbrough – piano
- Gary Versace – accordion
- Lage Lund – guitar
- Jay Anderson – bass
- Clarence Penn – drums
- Rogerio Boccato – percussion
