= The Bolla Quartet =

Jazz band based in Hungary

The Bolla Quartet is a jazz band based in Hungary.

The Bolla Quartet is one of Hungary's youngest and most successful jazz bands. The quartet was founded on 15 October 2003 by Gabor Bolla, a school-age saxophone player. They were the winners of the 2005 Avignon Jazz Festival Competition, taking the First Prize and the Audience Prize, their pianist, Robert Szakcsi Lakatos, taking the Best Soloist Prize. They have given concerts both in Hungary and abroad, including Germany, Austria, France, Russia, the Netherlands, Belgium, and the United Kingdom.

== The members ==
=== Gabor Bolla ===
Bolla was born on 15 October 1988. At the age of ten he started playing classical music on the clarinet. He was twelve when he won first prize in the National Music Schools' Competition. Towards the end of 2001 he started to show an interest in jazz, influenced mainly by the music to which his jazz-loving parents were listening. He took up the soprano and then the tenor saxophone, and is mainly self-taught on those instruments. He received the Hans Koller Prize as the Talent of the Year in Austria in 2004.

After playing the saxophone for only six months, he was picked out to play at the Getxo Jazz Festival in Bilbao. Since then he has been playing with the leading jazzmen in his own country. During the summer of 2003 Gábor was the only Hungarian and the only teenager who qualified for the semi-finals of the World Saxophone Competition held at the Montreux Jazz Festival. He brought the house down when he played, but failed to make the finals. He was also well received at the Yatra Jazz Festival in India and at the Bucharest Jazz Festival in Romania.

Bolla has performed with David Murray, Guy Barker, Art Themen, John Critchinson, Bryan Spring, Benny Golson, Johnny Griffin, Roy Hargrove, Joey Alexander and John Engels.

=== Robert Szakcsi Lakatos ===
Lakatos is equally at home as a classical or a jazz pianist. He won both the Best Soloist and Best Pianist prizes at the 1995 Krakow International Jazz Festival, and then a year later took first prize at the Bach Piano Competition organized by Radio Basel in Switzerland. He won first prize at the Piano Competition of the Montreux Jazz Festival in 2001, and the Best Soloist title at the 2005 Avignon Jazz Festival. Lakatos comes from a long line of Gypsy musicians.

=== Gyorgy Orban ===
Orban plays double bass. He was studying classical guitar from the age of six until he turned eighteen. He took up the double bass after that as he felt he could best express himself on that instrument. In 2003 he came third at the National Jazz Bass Competition organised by Hungarian Radio. He's played at several important jazz festivals and is a member of the famous New Gypsy Jazz outfit led by pianist Bela Szakcsi Lakatos and can also be heard on their riveting album as well as on records by the world-famous tenor-sax player Tony Lakatos.

=== Andras Mohay ===
Mohay is the band's drummer, as well as playing with four other Hungarian bands.

== Discography ==
- 2004: The Way We Play
