= Winter Morning Walks =

Studio album by Maria Schneider and Dawn Upshaw
- Released: 2013
- Recorded: May 2–3, 2012; September 26–27, 2012
- Studios: American Academy of Arts and Letters, Ted Mann Concert Hall at the University of Minnesota
- Genres: Jazz, big band
- Length: 77:21
- Label: ArtistShare
- Producer: David Frost

Maria Schneider--> chronology
| Sky Blue (2007) | Winter Morning Walks (2013) | The Thompson Fields (2015) |

Professional ratings
Review scores
| Source | Rating |
|---|---|
| All About Jazz | 5/5 stars |
| The Australian | 4/5 stars |
| The Guardian | 4/5 stars |

Winter Morning Walks is a studio album by Maria Schneider and Dawn Upshaw. It consists of two song cycles, Winter Morning Walks (with text from the poems of Ted Kooser) and Carlos Drummond de Andrade Stories (with text from the poems of Carlos Drummond de Andrade translated to English by Mark Strand) The album won and Grammy Award for Best Engineered Album, Classical and Grammy Award for Best Classical Vocal Solo in 2014, and the Winter Morning Walks song cycle won the Grammy Award for Best Classical Contemporary Composition the same year.

== Reception ==
Vincent Plush of The Australian wrote "Schneider's music hails from the glorious American tradition of song-setting from Gershwin to Sondheim, framed in the open prairie sonorities of Copland and gentle jazz-inflected barbs of John Adams. It flows in an unbroken expressive stream, lyrical and ingratiating to the ear. Her melodies elevate Kooser's prosaic lines, suggesting an opera composer of uncommon promise".

Fred Kaplan of Stereophile stated: "This is gorgeous music. There are shards and strands of Copland, Sondheim, Barber, and Ives, though the sound is distinctively Schneider, who is ever-evolving into a composer of—beyond genre—Great American Music".
