= Tim Ries =

- Born: Timothy M. Ries; 15 August 1959 (age 67); Detroit, U.S.
- Genres: Jazz, pop
- Occupations: Musician; composer; music educator
- Instruments: Saxophone; keyboards
- Member of: The Rolling Stones; The Pussycat Dolls
- Website: timries.com

Timothy M. Ries (born 15 August 1959) is an American saxophonist, composer, arranger, band leader, and music educator at the collegiate/conservatory level. Ries is in his twentieth year as a professor of jazz studies at the University of Toronto. His universe of work as composer, arranger, and instrumentalist ranges from rock to jazz to classical to experimental to ethno to fusions of respective genres thereof. His notable works with wide popularity include The Rolling Stones Project, a culmination of jazz arrangements of music by the Rolling Stones produced on two albums, the first in 2005 and the second in 2008.

== Career ==
From 1982 to 1984, Ries taught jazz improvisation at the University of Michigan. In the 1990s, he made it his day job. Ries has held teaching posts at the University of Bridgeport (1994), Mannes School of Music (1994–1996), The New School (1995–1998), City College of New York (1995–2000), New Jersey City University (2003), and Rutgers University (2003–2005). Most recently, he was Professor of Jazz Studies at the University of Toronto (2007–10).

Ries has recorded five albums as leader. As collaborator and sideman, he has recorded with pianist Franck Amsallem, Phil Woods, Tom Harrell, Al Foster, John Patitucci, Dave Liebman, Danilo Perez, Maynard Ferguson, Red Garland, Badal Roy, Maria Schneider (musician), and Donald Byrd.

As a soprano saxophonist, Ries was one of the founding members of the PRISM Quartet, a saxophone chamber group that endures today. Besides himself, the founding members were Michael Whitcombe (alto), Matthew Levy (tenor), Timothy Miller (bari). In 2000, the quartet recorded Real Standard Time on Naxos Records.

As a sideman on saxophone, keyboards, and organ, Ries toured with the Rolling Stones during 2003–2004. Ries arranged compositions by Keith Richards and Mick Jagger, which were recorded on off-days during the Stones' A Bigger Bang World Tour. Subsequently, Ries has toured with The Rolling Stones in 2005, 2006, 2007 and again in 2012, 2013 and 2014.

Ries has composed over one hundred works. As saxophonist with the PRISM Quartet, Ries has performed William Bolcom's Concerto Grosso, for saxophone quartet and orchestra, with 13 orchestras, including the Detroit Symphony, the Dallas Symphony, and Cleveland. As a saxophonist soloist, he performed the American premiere of Takashi Yoshimatsu's Cyber Bird Concerto with the Brooklyn Philharmonic at Carnegie Hall.

== Selected discography ==
- Regards, Freelance (1993); OCLC 122939190

Recorded January 1993, live at BMG Studio A, New York City
Tim Ries (tenor & soprano sax), Franck Amsallem (piano), Scott Colley (bass), Bill Stewart (drums)

- Is That So? Sunnyside (1996); OCLC 53349589

Recorded July 18 & 19, 1990, at Clinton Recording Studios, New York City
Tim Ries (tenor & soprano sax, flute), Franck Amsallem (piano), Leon Parker (drums, percussion)

- Imaginary Time, Moo (1994); OCLC 53349555

Recorded May 5 & 6, 1994, at Sound on Sound Studios, New York City
Tim Ries, Randy Brecker (trumpet), Scott Wendholt (de) (trumpet), Charles Gordon (trombone), Ben Monder (guitar), Franck Amsallem (piano),[Scott Colley (bass), Joey Baron (drums), Billy Hart (drums)

- Universal Spirits Criss Cross (1998); OCLC 50487679

Recorded October 12, 1997, at RPM Studio, New York City
Tim Ries, Scott Wendholt (de) (trumpet), Ben Monder (guitar), Scott Colley ( bass), Billy Drummond (drums)

- PRISM Quartet, Real Standard Time, Innova (2000)

Recorded 2000; all but "Your Gentle Heart" recorded at Current Sounds, New York City; "Your Gentle Heart recorded at Settlement Music School, Philadelphia
Tim Ries (soprano sax), Michael Whitcombe (alto sax), Matthew Levy (tenor sax), Taimur Sullivan (bari sax), John Riley (drums)

- Alternate Side Criss Cros (2001); OCLC 50137774

Recorded June 3, 2000, Systems Two Recording Studios, Brooklyn
Tim Ries (tenor & soprano saxophone), Greg Gisbert (trumpet & flugelhorn), Michael Davis (trombone), Ben Monder (guitar), Stacey Shames (Harp), Larry Goldings (piano & organ), John Patitucci (bass), Billy Drummond (bass)

- The Rolling Stones Project Concord (2005); OCLC 61279904
- Stones World: The Rolling Stones Project II, Sunnyside (2008); OCLC 255920696

Tim Ries (alto, tenor, and soprano saxophones, piano), Charlie Watts (drums), Keith Richards (guitar), Mick Jagger (harmonica), Ronnie Wood (guitar, lap steel), Adam Rogers (guitar) and Tidawt (fusion ensemble)

With Jack DeJohnette

- Sound Travels (Golden Beam/eOne, 2012)

With the Joe Roccisano Orchestra

- Leave Your Mind Behind (Landmark, 1995)

== Education ==
Tim Ries came from a musical family in Tecumseh, Michigan, about 70 miles from Detroit. His father Jack Ries (né Jack Leonard Ries; 1924–1990) was a professional trumpet player; his mother, Edith Viola (née O'Neil; 1925–2006), played piano; and his three sisters sang and also played the piano. Ries is a 1977 graduate of Tecumseh High School in Tecumseh, Michigan. His high school band director was Jimmie L. Rice (born 1946).

In 1981, Ries earned a Bachelor of Music in Jazz Studies at the University of North Texas College of Music in Denton. While at North Texas, he was a member of the 1980–1981 One O'Clock Lab Band during Leon Breeden's last year as director and also a member of the 1981–1982 One O'Clock during Neil Slater's first year as director. During his two-year tenure in the One O'Clock he performed on the Lab 81 and Lab 82, both studio recordings, and European Tour '82, a live at the Montreux Jazz Festival, July 20, 1982. In 1984, Ries earned his master's degree in saxophone from the University of Michigan.

His influential saxophone teachers have included James B. Forger (born 1951), Michigan All State Band, Ann Arbor (1971–1972), Larry Teal, Interlochen Arts Academy (1971–1972), Lynn Klock, Interlochen Arts Academy (1976–1977), Jim Riggs, University of North Texas (1979–1982), Donald Sinta, University of Michigan (1982–1984), Dave Liebman, New York (1986–1988), and Michael Brecker at Hastings-on-Hudson, New York (1996–1999).

His key composition teachers have included William Bolcom, University of Michigan (1982–1984), Bob Brookmeyer, BMI Composers Workshop (1988–1990), and Manny Albam, BMI Composers Workshop (1988–1990)
