= Laurie Frink =

American jazz musician (1951–2013)

Laurie Ann Frink (August 8, 1951, Pender, Nebraska – July 13, 2013, New York City) was an American jazz trumpeter who worked primarily in big band idioms.

Frink attended the University of Nebraska–Lincoln (1969-1972) and studied under Jimmy Maxwell (1972-1974). From 1978 to 1987 she played trumpet in the Mel Lewis Orchestra, and during the same period was a member of Gerry Mulligan's concert band. She worked with George Russell in 1980 and with the bands of Benny Goodman (1986) and Buck Clayton (1988). She began playing in Bob Mintzer's ensemble in 1984, playing with him until 1997. From 1992 until her death, she was a member of the Maria Schneider Orchestra. She also worked with John Hollenbeck, Darcy James Argue, and Ryan Truesdell.

Frink was credited as a jazz educator and counselor. She taught extensively in New York, including at the Manhattan School of Music, the New School for Social Research, Westchester Conservatory, and SUNY-Purchase. With John McNeil, she published the trumpet instruction book Flexus: Trumpet Calisthenics for the Modern Improviser in 2003.

Frink died of cancer of the bile duct in 2013 at the age of 61. "A Potter's Song" on the Maria Schneider Orchestra's album The Thompson Fields was dedicated to her memory.
