= John Fedchock =

American trombonist, bandleader, and arranger

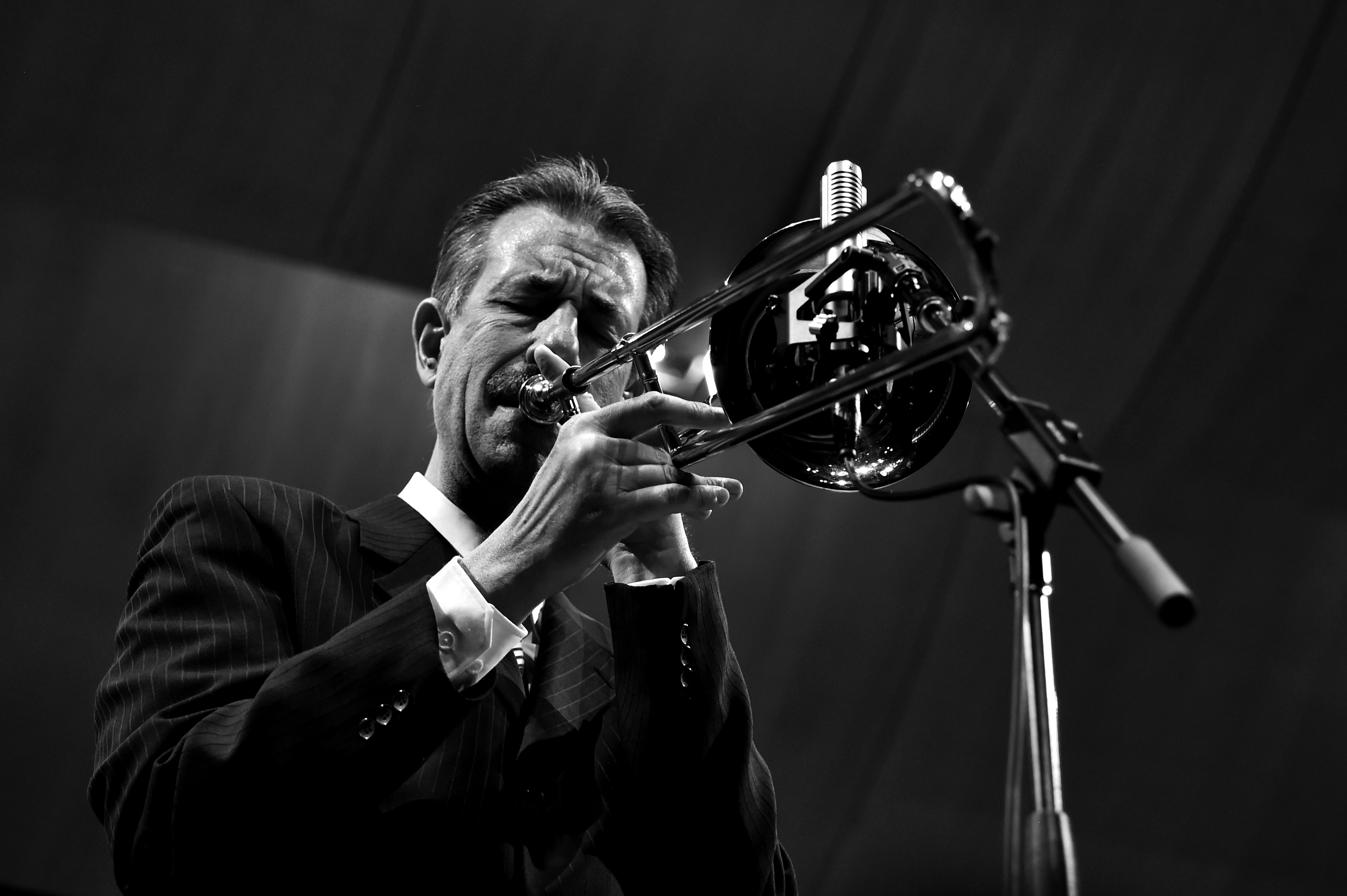

Background information
- Born: John William Fedchock; September 18, 1957 (age 68); Cleveland, Ohio, U.S.
- Genres: Jazz
- Instrument: Trombone

John William Fedchock (born September 18, 1957) is an American jazz trombonist, bandleader, and arranger.

== Early life and education ==
Fedchock was born in Cleveland, Ohio. He studied at Ohio State University and the Eastman School of Music at the University of Rochester.

== Career ==
Fedchock worked for the Woody Herman Orchestra in the 1980s and was noted for his arrangements. He also worked with Gerry Mulligan, Louie Bellson, Bob Belden, Rosemary Clooney, and Susannah McCorkle. He recorded his first album as a leader in 1992 with the New York Big Band, which was active into the late-2000s.

== Discography ==
- New York Big Band (Reservoir, 1992)
- On the Edge (Reservoir, 1998)
- Hit the Bricks (Reservoir, 2000)
- No Nonsense (Reservoir, 2002)
- Up and Running (Reservoir, 2007)
- Fluidity (Summit, 2015)
- Like It Is (MAMA, 2015)
- Reminiscence (Summit, 2018)
- Justifiably J.J.: A Centennial Tribute (Live at the Jazz Kitchen, Indianapolis) (Summit, 2024)
