= ArtistShare =

Crowdfunding website

- Website type: Music / Record Label /Crowdfunding
- Owners: ArtistShare, inc
- Creator: Brian Camelio
- Website: ArtistShare.com
- Commercial: Yes
- Registration: Required for participation in artist projects
- Current status: online

ArtistShare is the internet's first crowdfunding website. It also operates as a record label and business model for artists which enables them to fund their projects by allowing the general public to directly finance, watch the creative process, and in most cases gain access to extra material from an artist. According to Bloomberg News, the company's chief executive officer, record producer Brian Camelio, founded ArtistShare in 2000 with the idea that fans would finance production costs for albums sold only on the Internet and Artists also would enjoy much more favourable contract terms. ArtistShare was described in 2005 as a "completely new business model for creative artists" which "benefits both the artist and the fans by financing new and original artistic projects while building a strong and loyal fan base".

== History ==
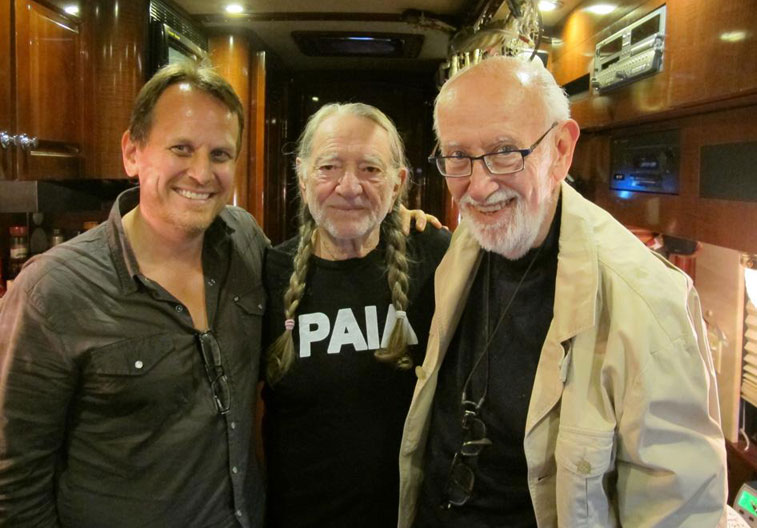
ArtistShare founder Brian Camelio, singer Willie Nelson, and Blue Note Records President Bruce Lundvall on Willie Nelson's tour bus

A United States–based company, ArtistShare (2001) is documented as being the first crowdfunding website followed later by sites such as Sellaband (2006), SliceThePie (2007), IndieGoGo (2008), Spot.us (2008), Pledge Music (2009), and Kickstarter (2009).

ArtistShare projects have received 29 Grammy nominations and 10 Grammy awards to date.

In 2005, American composer Maria Schneider's Concert in the Garden became the first album in Grammy history to win an award without being available in retail stores. The album was ArtistShare's first fan-funded project. Schneider received four nominations that year for the fan-funded album and won the Grammy for Best Large Jazz Ensemble Album. According to ArtistShare.com, ArtistShare artists consist of "some of today's most prestigious artists including Pulitzer prize and Oscar nominated writers, Guggenheim fellowship recipients and NEA Jazz Masters".

In May 2013, ArtistShare partnered with Blue Note Records to form a collaboration titled 'Blue Note/ArtistShare'. The Blue Note/ArtistShare collaboration was forged by Brian Camelio, Bruce Lundvall, and Don Was, President of Blue Note Records. In Blue Note's press release about the collaboration, Lundvall, Blue Note Chairman Emeritus, is quoted as saying, "'ArtistShare founder Brian Camelio is a true visionary. I see the ArtistShare business model as a key component of the future music business'" The collaboration will "'essentially serve as a low-risk development arm of the label'" since the recordings will be funded by the fans.

== Grammy Awards ==
- Best Large Jazz Ensemble Album: Concert in the Garden by Maria Schneider (2005); The Thompson Fields by Maria Schneider (2015)
- Best Instrumental Composition: "Into the Light" by Billy Childs (2006); "Cerulean Skies" by Maria Schneider (2008); "The Path Among the Trees" by Billy Childs (2011); "How About You" from the Gil Evans Project:Centennial (2013)
- Best Latin Jazz Album: Simpático by Brian Lynch and Eddie Palmieri (2007)
- Best Contemporary Classical Composition: Winter Morning Walks, by Maria Schneider (2014)
- Best Classical Vocal Solo: Dawn Upshaw, Winter Morning Walks
- Best Engineered Album, Classical: Winter Morning Walks

== Patent dispute ==
On September 30, 2011, Kickstarter filed a declaratory judgment suit against ArtistShare and Fan Funded which owns U.S. patent US 7885887, "Methods and apparatuses for financing and marketing a creative work".

In June 2015, US District Judge Katherine Failla ruled in favor of KickStarter.

== See also ==
- Comparison of crowd funding services
