= Maria Schneider (musician) =

American composer and orchestra leader (born 1960)

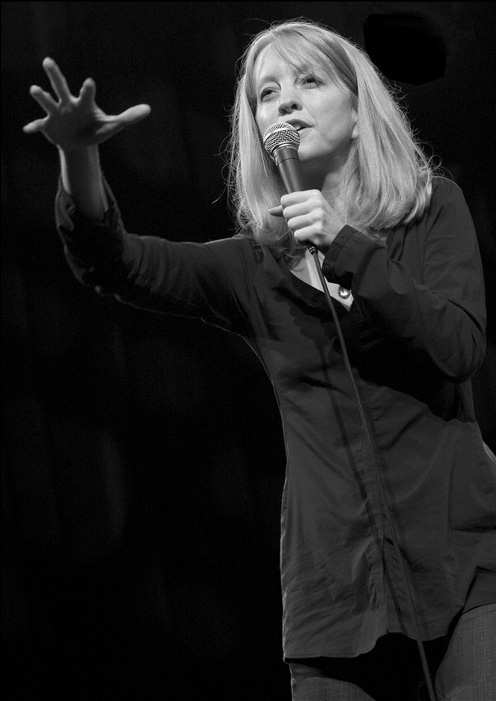
- Schneider at the North Sea Jazz Festival, Rotterdam, 2008

Background information
- Born: Maria Lynn Schneider; November 27, 1960 (age 65); Windom, Minnesota, U.S.
- Genres: Jazz, big band, avant-garde, contemporary classical
- Occupations: Composer, bandleader, musician
- Instrument: Piano
- Years active: 1980s–present
- Labels: Enja, ArtistShare
- Website: www.mariaschneider.com

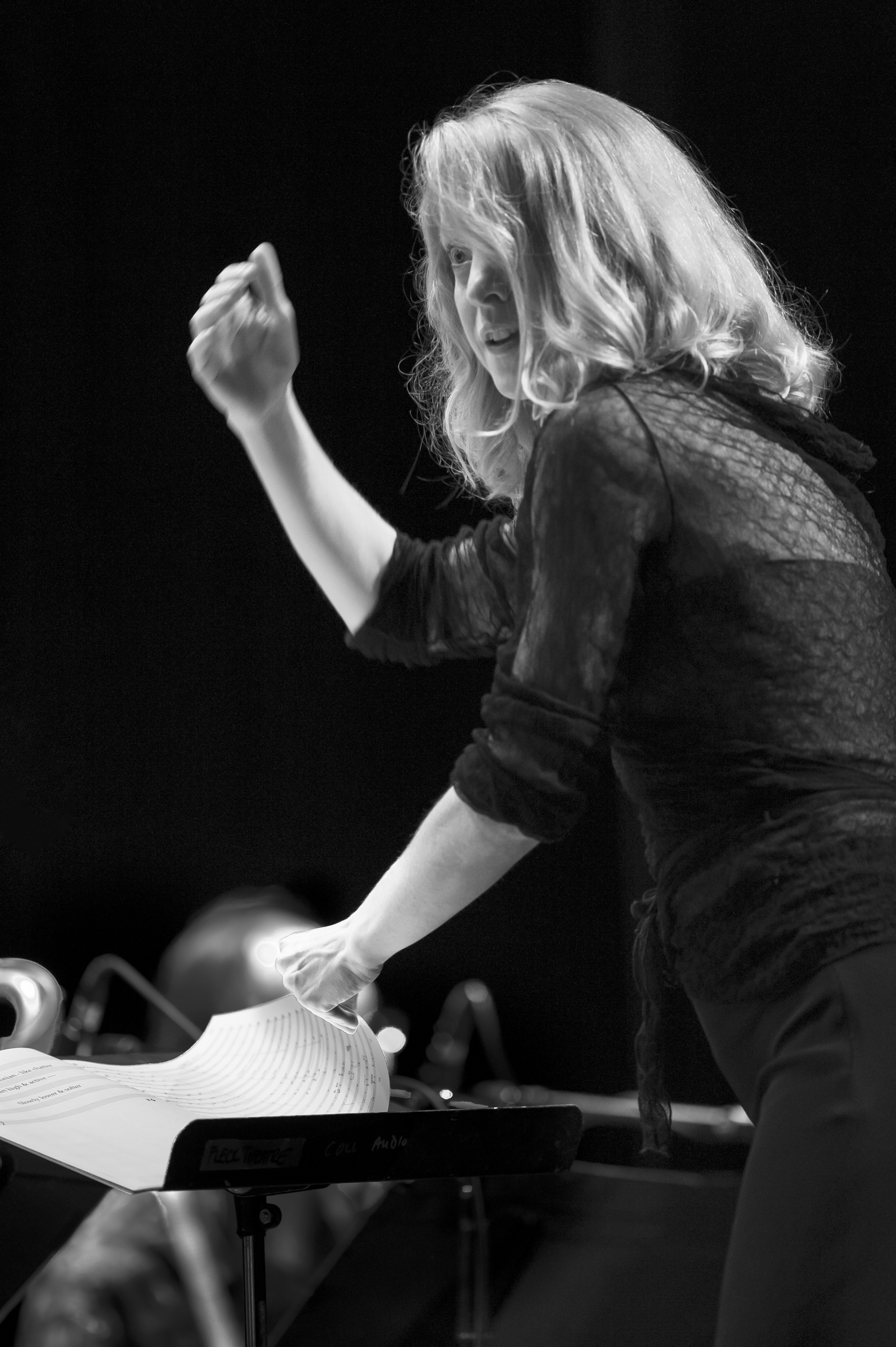
Schneider at TD Canada Trust Toronto Jazz Festival, 2009

Maria Lynn Schneider (born November 27, 1960) is an American composer and jazz orchestra leader who has won multiple Grammy Awards.

== Biography ==
Born in Windom, Minnesota, Schneider studied music theory and composition at the University of Minnesota, graduating in 1983, then earned a master's degree in Music in 1985 from the Eastman School of Music, studying for one year as well at the University of Miami. After leaving Eastman, she was hired by Gil Evans as his copyist and assistant.

She collaborated with Evans for the next few years, working with him on music for a tour with Sting and assisting him as he scored the film The Color of Money. Before she became one of the most acclaimed composers and bandleaders of her generation, Schneider received an NEA Apprenticeship Grant to study with Bob Brookmeyer in 1985.

In 1988, Schneider formed her first band in collaboration with jazz trombonist John Fedchock, her husband at the time, and that group appeared at Visiones in Greenwich Village. Both that group and her marriage would dissolve, but Schneider followed up in 1992 by forming the Maria Schneider Jazz Orchestra, which would appear weekly at Visiones from 1993 until the venue closed in 1998. Albums by the group have been released as by the Maria Schneider Orchestra since 2000.

From 2005 through 2019, the Maria Schneider Orchestra performed an annual Thanksgiving week-long gig at the Jazz Standard in New York City. The orchestra has also performed at jazz festivals and concert halls in Europe, South America, and Asia. Schneider has performed with over 80 groups in over 30 countries and has taught at universities worldwide. In 2013, she received an honorary doctorate from the University of Minnesota.

Although three of the orchestra's albums had been previously nominated, Schneider's Concert in the Garden (2004) was the first to win a Grammy Award. It was also the first such award-winning album produced by ArtistShare, a fan funded platform that has (as of 2017) received 30 Grammy Award nominations and 10 Grammy Award wins. The orchestra has since won additional Grammy Awards for the large-ensemble jazz albums The Thompson Fields and Data Lords, while Schneider receive Grammy Awards for individual compositions on the albums Sky Blue and Data Lords. The orchestra performed a 30th anniversary concert in November 2024 at The Town Hall in New York City, marking 30 years since the release of their first album, Evanescence.

Aside from her jazz orchestral works, Schneider's Winter Morning Walks (2013) album featured soprano Dawn Upshaw, the Saint Paul and Australian Chamber Orchestras, bassist Jay Anderson, pianist Frank Kimbrough, and multi-instrumentalist Scott Robinson. The album accompanied poetry written by U.S. Poet Laureate Ted Kooser and was funded by ArtistShare. It won Schneider a Grammy Award for Best Classical Contemporary Composition. Dawn Upshaw also won a Grammy for her vocal performance, while the Grammy Award for Best Engineered Album, Classical award went to David Frost, Tim Martyn, and Brian Losch.

== Advocacy for musicians ==
Schneider has been a strong advocate for musicians' rights and copyright. She has testified before Congress, and has been asked to participate in several round tables conducted by the United States Copyright Office. Schneider has been outspoken against YouTube and so-called "freemium" streaming models. She has published several open letters and white papers on these topics.

Schneider has been a board member of the National Academy of Recording Arts & Sciences for the New York local chapter and has been involved in many of the NARAS advocacy initiatives, including Grammys on the Hill. In April 2014, on behalf of NARAS, Schneider testified on Section 512 of Section 17 before the House Subcommittee on Courts, Intellectual Property and the Internet.

Schneider's advocacy against big data companies and their impact on music, culture and privacy is reflected in some of her compositions of the late 2010s, including pieces entitled "Data Lords", commissioned by the U.S. Library of Congress (2016); "Don't Be Evil"; and "Sputnik". Several of these compositions appeared on the 2020 album Data Lords.

=== Class action lawsuit against YouTube ===
On July 2, 2020, Maria Schneider filed a class action lawsuit with Pirate Monitor Ltd. against YouTube arguing that smaller copyright holders are unable to access YouTube's Content ID system which would allow them to publish, monetize, and block infringing material. Schneider and Pirate Monitor claimed that they and other small copyright rights holders were denied access to Content ID, leaving them only the options of self-policing or ignoring infringement of their own property. They also argued that Content ID's weak punishments encourage repeat infringement and that YouTube did not qualify for DMCA safe harbor.

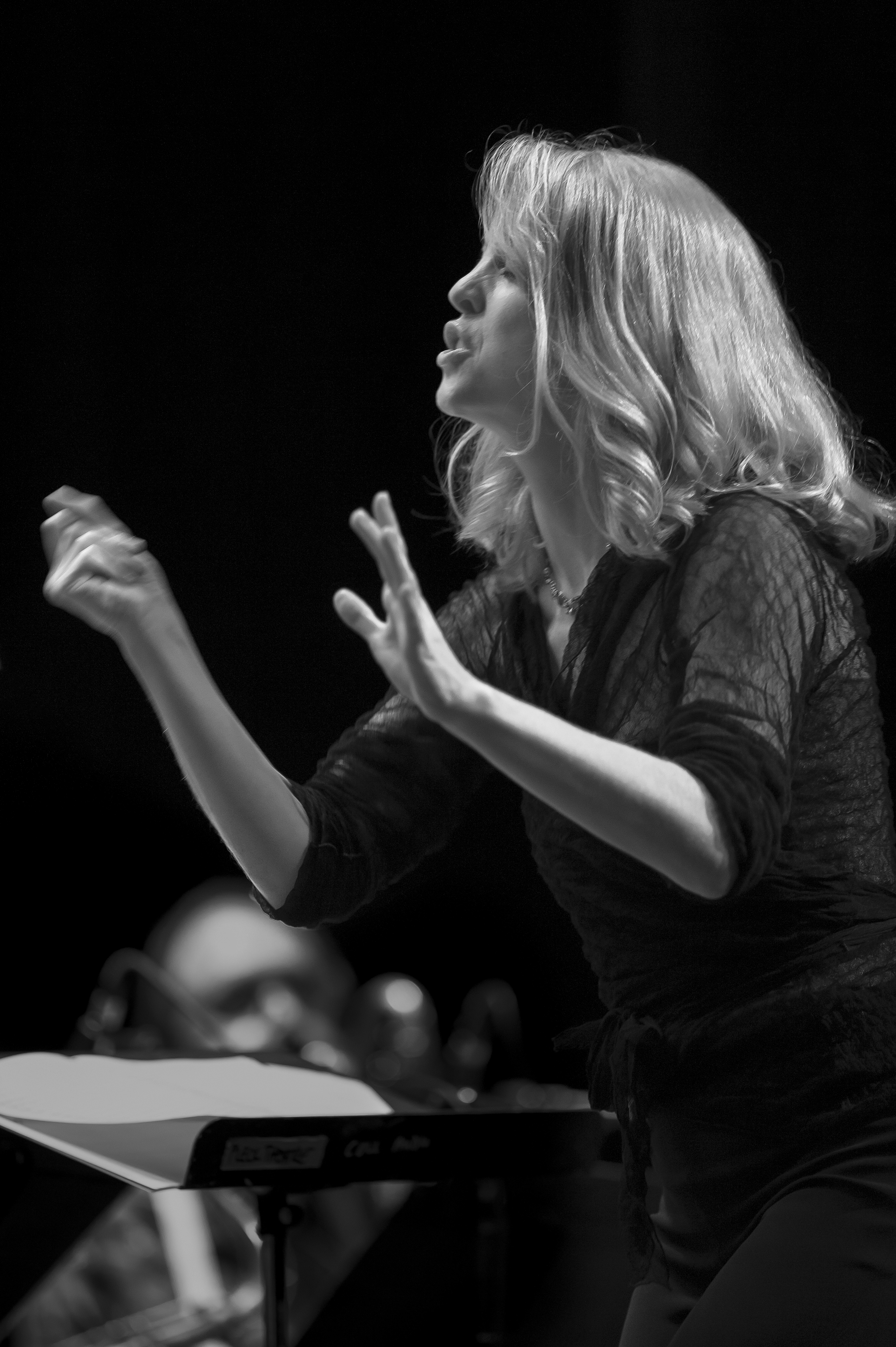
Schneider at TD Canada Trust Toronto Jazz Festival, 2009

Pirate Monitor Ltd voluntarily withdrew from the class action lawsuit on March 8, 2021, while Maria Schneider continued with the case. The case was dismissed in June 2023 before going to trial.

== Personal life ==
Schneider is an avid birdwatcher and enlisted band members to contribute bird calls to "Cerulean Skies" on her album Sky Blue. Other bird-related songs on her albums include "Waxwing" on Coming About, "Bird Count" on Days of Wine and Roses - Live at the Jazz Standard, and "Arbiters of Evolution" on The Thompson Fields.

== Awards and honors ==
- Best Composer, Best Arranger, Best Big Band, DownBeat magazine Annual Critics' Poll, 2006–2012; 2016
- Jazz Album of the Year, Composer of the Year, Arranger of the Year, Large Jazz Ensemble of the Year, Jazz Journalists Association, 2005
- Grammy Award for Best Large Jazz Ensemble Album, Concert in the Garden, 2004
- Grammy Award for Best Instrumental Composition, "Cerulean Skies", 2007
- Grammy Award for Best Classical Contemporary Composition, Winter Morning Walks, 2013
- Grammy Award for Best Large Jazz Ensemble Album, The Thompson Fields, 2015
- Grammy Award for Best Arrangement, Instrumental and Vocals, "Sue (Or in a Season of Crime)" (David Bowie) from Nothing Has Changed 2015
- 2019 NEA Jazz Masters Fellowship
- Concert in the Garden was inducted into the National Recording Registry in 2019
- Grammy Award for Best Instrumental Composition, "Sputnik", 2020
- Grammy Award for Best Large Jazz Ensemble Album, Data Lords, 2020
- Finalist for the Pulitzer Prize in Music for Data Lords, 2021
- Elected member of the American Academy of Arts and Letters, 2023
- Rolf Schock Prize in Musical Arts, 2026

== Discography ==
- Evanescence (Enja, 1994) – rec. 1992
- Coming About (Enja, 1996) – rec. 1995
- Days of Wine and Roses - Live at the Jazz Standard (ArtistShare, 2000 [limited edition], 2005 [regular release]) – live
- Allégresse (Enja, 2000)
- Concert in the Garden (ArtistShare, 2004)
- Sky Blue (ArtistShare, 2007)
- Winter Morning Walks (ArtistShare, 2013) – rec. 2012
- The Thompson Fields (ArtistShare, 2015) – rec. 2014
- Data Lords (ArtistShare, 2020) – rec. 2019
- Decades (ArtistShare, 2024)[3LP]
