= Little Things Run The World =

Studio album by Ben Allison
- Released: 2008
- Genre: Jazz
- Label: Palmetto Records

Ben Allison chronology
| Cowboy Justice (2006) | Little Things Run The World (2008) | Think Free (2009) |

Little Things Run The World is the eighth album by bassist Ben Allison. It was released on the Palmetto Records label in 2008.

== Track list ==
All compositions by Ben Allison, except where noted.

1. Respiration
2. Little Things Run The World
3. Four Folk Songs
4. Language of Love (Steve Cardenas)
5. Roll Credits
6. Blowback
7. Jealous Guy (John Lennon)
8. Man Size Safe

== Personnel ==
- Ben Allison – Bass, Guitar
- Steve Cardenas – Guitar
- Ron Horton – Trumpet, Flugelhorn
- Michael Sarin – Drums
- Michael Blake – Sax (tracks 2,6,8)
