= Buzz (Ben Allison album) =

Studio album by Ben Allison
- Released: 2004
- Genre: Jazz
- Label: Palmetto Records

Ben Allison chronology
Peace Pipe (2002)	Buzz (2004)	Cowboy Justice (2006)

Professional ratings
Review scores
Source	Rating
The Penguin Guide to Jazz Recordings	4/4 stars

Buzz is the sixth album by bassist Ben Allison. It was released on the Palmetto Records label in 2004.

== Track listing ==
All compositions by Ben Allison, except where noted.

1. "Respiration"
2. "Buzz"
3. "Green Al"
4. "Mauritania" (Michael Blake)
5. "Erato" (Andrew Hill)
6. "R&B Fantasy"
7. "Across the Universe" (John Lennon)

== Personnel ==
- Ben Allison – Bass, Guitar
- Michael Blake – Saxophones
- Ted Nash – Saxophone, Flute
- Clark Gayton – Trombone
- Frank Kimbrough – Piano, Wurlitzer
- Mike Sarin – Drums
