= Andy Biskin =

- Born: San Antonio
- Genres: Jazz
- Occupations: Instrumentalist, composer
- Instruments: clarinet, bass clarinet
- Website: andybiskin.com

Andy Biskin (né Andrew Barry Biskin; born in San Antonio, Texas), is an American jazz clarinetist, bass clarinetist, composer, and filmmaker based primarily in New York City.

== Career ==
Biskin is a graduate of Yale University and once served as an assistant for Alan Lomax. Biskin's music has often been played on NPR between segments on All Things Considered and Fresh Air with Terry Gross. In 2000, Biskin's album, Dogmental, was named album of the week in The New York Times by Ben Ratliff.

In 2004, he animated and set to music a series of Rube Goldberg machines, including a "self-operating napkin", for his film Goldberg's Variations. The piece was featured in 2013 at the Brooklyn Academy of Music Next Wave Festival.

== Discography ==
=== As leader ===
- Dogmental (GM, 2000), featuring Ron Horton (trumpet), Bruce Eidem (trombone), Ben Allison (bass), Matt Wilson (drums)
- Early American: The Melodies of Stephen Foster (Strudelmedia, 2006), featuring John Hollenbeck (drums), Pete McCann (guitar/banjo), Chris Washburne (trombone/tuba)
- Trio Tragico (Strudelmedia, 2006), featuring Dave Ballou (trumpet), Drew Gress (bass)
- Ibid: Act Necessary (Strudelmedia, 2014), featuring Kirk Knuffke (cornet), Brian Drye (trombone), Jeff Davis (drums)
- The Spokes: Not So Fast (Strudelmedia, 2015), featuring Phillip Johnston (soprano sax), Curtis Hasselbring (trombone)
- 16 Tons: Songs from the Alan Lomax Collection (Andorfin, 2018), featuring John Carlson, Dave Smith, Kenny Warren (trumpets), Rob Garcia (drums)
- Reed Basket (Andorfin, 2024), featuring Peter Hess, Mike McGinnis, and Sam Sadigursky (clarinets)

== Video ==
- Lily Dale: Messages from the Spirit Side of Life (documentary), Cinema Guild (1991); OCLC 27818405

Produced and directed by Biskin
