= Cowboy Justice =

Studio album by Ben Allison
- Released: 2006
- Genre: Jazz
- Label: Palmetto

Ben Allison chronology
Buzz (2004)	Cowboy Justice (2006)	Little Things Run The World (2008)

Cowboy Justice is the seventh album by bassist Ben Allison. It was released by Palmetto Records.

== Reception ==
Professional ratings
Review scores
Source	Rating
The Penguin Guide to Jazz Recordings	3.5/4 stars

The New York Times review commented: "Together the band makes a virtue of simplicity, often pushing toward a pulsating, layered sense of groove." The Penguin Guide to Jazz suggested that guitarist Cardenas had not fully blended in to Allison's band, and described the album as a "fine balance of violence, tawdriness, refined beauty and raw satire".

== Track list ==
All compositions by Ben Allison.

1. "Tricky Dick"
2. "Talking Heads"
3. "Hey Man"
4. "Emergency"
5. "Midnight Cowboy"
6. "Tricky Rides Again"
7. "Weazy"
8. "Ruby's Roundabout"
9. "Blabbermouth"

== Personnel ==
- Ben Allison – bass, guitar
- Steve Cardenas – guitar
- Ron Horton – trumpet, flugelhorn
- Jeff Ballard – drums
