= Matt Wilson (jazz drummer) =

American jazz drummer (born 1964)

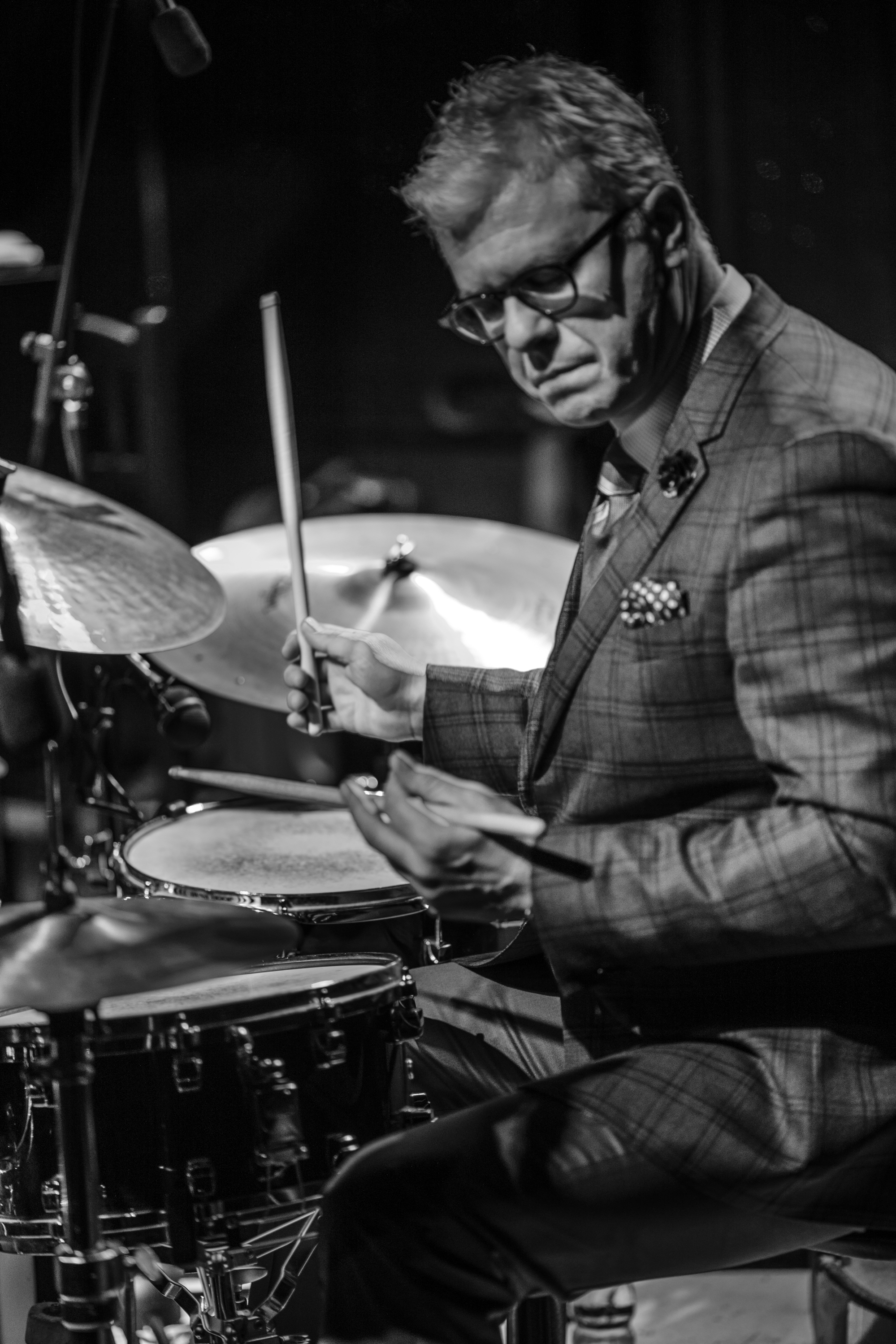

Background information
- Born: Matthew Edward Wilson; September 27, 1964 (age 62); Knoxville, Illinois
- Genre: Jazz
- Occupation: Musician
- Instrument: Drums
- Years active: 1980s–present
- Label: Palmetto
- Formerly of: Either/Orchestra
- Website: mattwilsonjazz.com

Matthew Edward Wilson (born September 27, 1964) is an American jazz drummer.

== Early life and education ==
Wilson was born in Knoxville, Illinois. He studied percussion at Wichita State University.

== Career ==
Wilson moved to New York City in 1992, and has worked with Lee Konitz, Cecil McBee, and Dewey Redman. When asked who influenced him as a performer and educator, Matt responds: "There's not one person I could point to because there's a lot of them."

== Discography ==
=== As leader ===
- As Wave Follows Wave (Palmetto, 1996)
- Going Once, Going Twice (Palmetto, 1998)
- Smile (Palmetto, 1999)
- Arts and Crafts (Palmetto, 2001)
- Humidity (Palmetto, 2003)
- Wake Up! (Palmetto, 2005)
- The Scenic Route (Palmetto, 2006)
- That's Gonna Leave a Mark (Palmetto, 2009)
- An Attitude for Gratitude (Palmetto, 2011)
- Gathering Call (Palmetto, 2013)
- Honey and Salt (Palmetto, 2017). Matt Wilson recorded this album with Ron Miles.
- Hug! (Palmetto, 2020)
- Vol pour Sidney (retour) Three tracks in quartet, one track Matt Wilson Quartet + Catherine Delaunay (nato, 2020)
- Good Trouble (Palmetto, 2024)

=== As co-leader ===
- with Lee Konitz, Gong with Wind Suite (SteepleChase, 2002)
- with Steve Beresford, Snodland (nato, 2011)

=== As sideman ===
With Dena DeRose

- I Can See Clearly Now (Sharp Nine, 2000)
- We Won't Forget You (HighNote, 2014)
- United (HighNote, 2016)

With Either/Orchestra

- The Calculus of Pleasure (Accurate, 1992)
- The Brunt (Accurate, 1994)
- Across the Omniverse (Accurate, 1996)

With Fred Hess

- The Long and Short of It (Tapestry, 2004)
- Crossed Paths (Tapestry, 2005)
- How 'Bout Now (Tapestry, 2006)
- In the Grotto (Alison, 2007)
- Single Moment (Alison, 2008)
- Hold On (Dazzle 2009)

With Bill Mays

- Out in PA (No Blooze Music, 1999)
- Summer Sketches (Palmetto, 2001)
- Going Home (Palmetto, 2003)
- Live at Jazz Standard (Palmetto, 2005)
- Live at COTA (No Blooze Music, 2019)

With Ted Nash

- Sidewalk Meeting (Arabesque, 2001)
- La Espada De La Noche (Palmetto, 2005)
- In the Loop (Palmetto, 2006)
- The Mancini Project (Palmetto, 2008)
- Live at Dizzy's Club Coca-Cola (Plastic Sax, 2018)

With Mario Pavone

- Remembering Thomas (Knitting Factory, 1999)
- Totem Blues (Knitting Factory, 2000)
- Mythos (Playscape, 2002)
- Boom (Playscape, 2004)
- Trio Arc (Playscape, 2008)

With Denny Zeitlin

- Slick Rock (Maxjazz, 2004)
- In Concert (Sunnyside, 2009)
- Stairway to the Stars (Sunnyside, 2014)
- Wishing On the Moon (Sunnyside, 2018)
- Live at Mezzrow (Sunnyside, 2020)

With others

- Karrin Allyson, Round Midnight (Concord Jazz, 2011)
- Helio Alves, Portrait in Black and White (Reservoir, 2003)
- Jay Anderson, Deepscape (SteepleChase, 2019)
- Ari Ambrose & Steven Riley, Tenor Treats (SteepleChase, 2009)
- Ari Ambrose & Steven Riley, Tenor Treats 2 (SteepleChase, 2009)
- Andy Biskin, Dogmental (GM, 2000)
- Jane Ira Bloom, Mental Weather (Outline, 2008)
- Jane Ira Bloom, Sixteen Sunsets (Outline, 2013)
- Michael Blake, Drift (Intuition, 2000)
- Craig Brann, A Conversation Between Brothers (SteepleChase, 2016)
- Steve Cardenas, Charlie & Paul (Newvelle, 2018)
- Thomas Chapin, Never Let Me Go (Playscape, 2012)
- Caleb Chapman, A Crescent Christmas Vol 1 (Rlegacy, 2012)
- Allan Chase, Dark Clouds with Silver Linings (Accurate, 1995)
- Alexis Cole, Someday My Prince Will Come (Venus, 2009)
- Georges Delerue, Music from the Films of Francois Truffaut (Nonesuch, 1997)
- Dominique Eade, When the Wind Was Cool (RCA Victor, 1997)
- Marty Ehrlich, A Trumpet in the Morning (New World, 2013)
- Oran Etkin, What's New? Reimaging Benny Goodman (Motema, 2015)
- Jacob Fischer, In New York City (Arbors, 2015)
- Joel Frahm, Sorry, no decaf (Palmetto, 1999)
- Don Friedman, Almost Everything (SteepleChase, 1995)
- Larry Goldings, Quartet (Palmetto, 2006)
- Brad Goode, By Myself (SteepleChase, 2001)
- Charlie Haden, Not in Our Name (Verve, 2005)
- Charlie Haden, Time/Life (Impulse!, 2016)
- Matt Haimovitz, Meeting of the Spirits (Oxingale, 2010)
- Mary Halvorson, Sifter (Relative Pitch, 2013)
- Ron Horton, Subtextures (Fresh Sound, 2003)
- Hank Jones, Alone Together (Edition Longplay, 2012)
- Vic Juris, Pastels (SteepleChase, 1996)
- Frank Kimbrough, Lullabluebye (Palmetto, 2004)
- Frank Kimbrough, Live at Kitano (Palmetto, 2012)
- Kirk Knuffke & Ted Brown, Pound Cake (SteepleChase, 2012)
- Lee Konitz, Strings for Holiday (Enja, 1996)
- Andy LaVerne, Pianissimo (SteepleChase, 2002)
- David Liebman, Liebman Plays Puccini (Arkadia Jazz 2001)
- Steven Lugerner, For We Have Heard (NoBusiness, 2013)
- Rita Marcotulli, The Very Thought of You (GoFour, 2019)
- Cecil McBee, Unspoken (Palmetto, 1996 [1997])
- John McNeil, East Coast Cool (OmniTone, 2006)
- Myra Melford, The Whole Tree Gone (Firehouse 12, 2010)
- Josh Nelson, Let It Go (Omagatoki, 2007)
- Sam Newsome, The Tender Side of Sammy Straighthorn (SteepleChase, 1998)
- The Herbie Nichols Project, Strange City (Palmetto, 2001)
- Fritz Pauer, New York Meeting (Jive Music, 1998)
- Ken Peplowski, Maybe September (Capri, 2013)
- Ken Peplowski, Enrapture (Capri, 2016)
- Noah Preminger, Before the Rain (Palmetto, 2011)
- Bruno Raberg, Lifelines (OrbisMusic, 2008)
- Eric Rasmussen, Schools Of Tristano (SteepleChase, 2007)
- Eric Rasmussen, Schools Of Tristano 2 (SteepleChase, 2008)
- Eric Rasmussen, Schools Of Tristano 3 (SteepleChase, 2008)
- Dewey Redman, In London (Palmetto, 1997)
- Ken Schaphorst, How to Say Goodbye (JCA, 2016)
- Larry Schneider, Jazz (SteepleChase, 2001)
- Janis Siegel, The Tender Trap (Monarch, 1999)
- Gary Smulyan, Bella Napoli (Capri, 2013)
- Gary Smulyan, Tadd's All Folks (SteepleChase, 2022)
- Mark Soskin, 17 (TCB, 2001)
- Mark Soskin, Everything Old Is New Again (SteepleChase, 2020)
- Mark Soskin, Ballad For A Rainy Afternoon (SteepleChase, 2021)
- Bob Stewart, Connections (Sunnyside, 2014)
- Curtis Stigers, You Inspire Me (Concord Jazz, 2003)
- Curtis Stigers, I Think It's Going to Rain Today (Concord Jazz, 2005)
- Mark Taylor, Circle Squared (Mark Taylor, 2002)
- Joris Teepe & Don Braden, Conversations (Creative Perspective Music, 2016)
- Jeremy Udden, Torchsongs (Fresh Sound, 2006)
- Dawn Upshaw, Dawn Upshaw Sings Rodgers & Hart (Nonesuch, 1996)
- Tom Varner, Second Communion (OmniTone, 2001)
- Gary Versace, Many Places (SteepleChase, 2006)
