= Third Eye (Ben Allison album) =

Studio album by Ben Allison
- Released: 1999
- Genre: Jazz
- Label: Palmetto Records

Ben Allison chronology
Medicine Wheel (1998)	Third Eye (1999)	Riding The Nuclear Tiger (2001)

Third Eye is the third album by bassist Ben Allison. It was released on the Palmetto Records label in 1999.

Professional ratings
Review scores
Source	Rating
The Penguin Guide to Jazz Recordings	3.5/4 stars

== Track listing ==
All compositions by Ben Allison, except where noted.

1. Four Folk Songs
2. Love Is Proximity (Herbie Nichols)
3. Kush
4. Random Sex and Violins
5. Mantra
6. A Life in the Day of Man Ray
7. Andrew
8. Hot Head
9. Pot Head

== Personnel ==
- Ben Allison – Bass, Guitar
- Michael Blake – Saxophones
- Ted Nash – Saxophones
- Tomas Ulrich – Cello
- Frank Kimbrough – Piano
- Ron Horton – Trumpet
- Jeff Ballard – Drums
- Ara Dinkjian – Oud, Cumbus
