= Think Free =

Think Free may refer to:

- Think Free (Ben Allison album)
- Think Free (Freeway album)
