= Riding the Nuclear Tiger =

Riding The Nuclear Tiger

Studio album by Ben Allison
- Released: 2001
- Genre: Jazz
- Label: Palmetto Records

Ben Allison chronology
Third Eye (1999)	Riding The Nuclear Tiger (2001)	Peace Pipe (2002)

Riding The Nuclear Tiger is the fourth album by bassist Ben Allison. It was released on the Palmetto Records label in 2001.

Professional ratings
Review scores
Source	Rating
The Penguin Guide to Jazz Recordings	4/4 stars

== Track list ==
All compositions by Ben Allison, except where noted.

1. Riding the Nuclear Tiger
2. Jazz Scene Voyeur
3. Love Chant Remix
4. Swiss Cheese D
5. Weazy
6. Charlie Brown's Psychedelic Christmas
7. Harlem River Line (Michael Blake)
8. Mysterious Visitor
9. Tectonics

== Personnel ==
- Ben Allison – bass, guitar
- Michael Blake – saxophones
- Ted Nash – saxophones
- Tomas Ulrich – cello
- Frank Kimbrough – piano
- Ron Horton – trumpet
- Jeff Ballard – drums
