= Layers of the City =

2017 jazz album by Ben Allison

Studio album by Ben Allison
- Released: 2017
- Genre: Jazz
- Label: Sonic Camera

Ben Allison chronology
The Stars Look Very Different Today (2013)	Layers of the City (2017)

Layers of the City is the 12th album by bassist Ben Allison. It was released on Allison's own Sonic Camera label on June 22, 2017. The album reached #9 on the JazzWeek Charts in July, 2017.

== Reception ==
Professional ratings
Review scores
Source	Rating
DownBeat	4/5 stars
All About Jazz	4.5/5 stars
Jazz Trail	A−

In a review for DownBeat, Paul de Barros called the album "a lovely sonic moving picture," and wrote that it "offers an engaging range of sonic impressions of Allison's home base, New York. Allison has always had a fine ear for tricky melodies, playful moods and an occasional dollop of world beat and free improv, and this album is no exception."

Writing for Jazz Trail, Filipe Freitas admired the album's "empowerment and enchantment," and stated: "The quintet's good chemistry is never in question and the music becomes a pure reflection of their cohesive spontaneity. Layers of the City mirrors Allison's uniquely expressive compositional style with illuminated strokes of genius, becoming an important entry in the bassist's stupendous discography."

Mac Randall of Jazz Times noted the album's "mood of deep thoughtfulness with a touch of mystery," and singled out "Blowback" for praise, calling it "an object lesson in the transmutational possibilities that a piece of music can contain."

In an article for JazzIz, Matt Micucci commented: "Like so many of Allison's previous releases, this one is consistently engaging and surprising, not unlike the metropolis that inspired it — his hometown of New York City, with its contrasting layers of grime and gleam, grit and dazzle."

Bird is the Worm's Dave Sumner stated that Allison "hasn't so much sought out a balance between divergent elements as he's found a way for them to coexist with a measured peacefulness," and noted that this "allows the more extreme qualities to stand out, side by side, one not dulling the sensation of the others, even as they work together to forge a middle-ground."

== Track list ==
All compositions by Ben Allison.

1. "Magic Number" – 6:47
2. "Enter the Dragon" – 8:12
3. "Ghost Ship" – 4:40
4. "Layers of the City" – 4:44
5. "The Detective's Wife" – 6:18
6. "Blowback" – 5:14
7. "Get Me Offa This Thing" – 5:15

== Personnel ==
- Ben Allison – electric bass, acoustic bass
- Jeremy Pelt – trumpet
- Steve Cardenas – guitar
- Frank Kimbrough - piano
- Allan Mednard – drums
