= Action-Refraction =

Action Refraction

Studio album by Ben Allison
- Released: 2011
- Genre: Jazz
- Length: 42:51
- Label: Palmetto

Ben Allison chronology
Think Free (2009)	Action Refraction (2011)	The stars Look Very Different Today (2013)

Professional ratings
Review scores
Source	Rating
AllMusic	4.5/5 stars

Action-Refraction is the tenth album by American bassist Ben Allison. It was released on the Palmetto Records label in 2011. It's his first album to focus on the compositions of others.

== Critical reception ==
In a review for AllMusic, critic reviewer Phil Freeman wrote: "Action-Refraction isn't a straight jazz album, but it's more likely to appeal to young jazz listeners than to indie rock fans, though it offers pleasures for anyone with open ears."

== Track list ==
Action-Refraction track listing
No.	Title	Writer(s)	Length
1.	"Jackie-ing"	Thelonious Monk	4:52
2.	"Missed"	PJ Harvey	5:15
3.	"Someday We'll All Be Free"	Donny Hathaway	7:11
4.	"Philadelphia"	Neil Young	5:37
5.	"St. Ita's Vision"	Samuel Barber	7:00
6.	"We've Only Just Begun"	Roger Nichols; Paul Williams	7:50
7.	"Broken"	Ben Allison	5:06

== Personnel ==
- Michael Blake – tenor saxophone, bass clarinet
- Jason Lindner – Prophet 08 analog synthesizer, piano
- Steve Cardenas – guitar
- Brandon Seabrook – guitar (tracks 3,7)
- Ben Allison – bass
- Rudy Royston – drums
