= Strange City =

Studio album by The Herbie Nichols Project
- Released: 2001
- Recorded: May 29 and 30, 2001
- Studio: Maggie's Farm, Buck's County, Pennsylvania
- Genre: Jazz
- Length: 53:48
- Label: Palmetto; PM-2077

The Herbie Nichols Project chronology
Dr. Cyclops' Dream (1999)	Strange City (2001)

Strange City is the third album by the Herbie Nichols Project, an American jazz ensemble dedicated to performing the music of composer and pianist Herbie Nichols. It was recorded during May 2001 at Maggie's Farm in Buck's County, Pennsylvania, and was released later that year by Palmetto Records. Led by pianist Frank Kimbrough and double bassist Ben Allison, the group also features saxophonists Ted Nash and Michael Blake, trumpeter Ron Horton, trombonist Wycliffe Gordon, and drummer Matt Wilson.

== Reception ==
Professional ratings
Review scores
Source	Rating
AllMusic	4/5 stars
The Penguin Guide to Jazz	3.5/4 stars
The Virgin Encyclopedia of Jazz	3/5 stars

In a review for AllMusic, David R. Adler wrote: "the group crafts a differently orchestrated universe for each track -- a production strategy that highlights the collaborative nature of the enterprise and gives everyone multiple moments in the spotlight... Clearly, hard work was done in fleshing out these arrangements, and yet the session is suffused with an offhanded sense of play and freedom."

The authors of The Penguin Guide to Jazz Recordings stated: "the playing has a lot of confident sparkle... As a repertory project, its arcane starting-point is a plus: no need to pull and squeeze these materials out of shape in search of newness."

C. Andrew Hovan of All About Jazz commented: "this set contains some of the ensemble's finest moments on record to date... there are ample opportunities not only to luxuriate in the compositional genius of Nichols, but also to admire the strong ensemble passages and the individual voices that make up the ensemble... [it is] a great program that not only interprets and extends the Nichols legacy but also speaks highly in regards to each group member's individual muse."

Author Gene Santoro called the album "a coolly unpredictable yet genre-smart treat," and remarked: "It can also function as a kind of primer about fill-in-the-dots jazz composition and arranging, the organic mesh linking written and improvised music woven by jazz performance."

Writing for Louisville Music News, Rick Forest noted: "This is not 'smooth' jazz, or even 'gentle' jazz. It's music to stretch your ears and make you aware of the possibility that 'fusion' came about long before Miles Davis. It's a different kind of fusion, to be sure, but it's a project well worth checking out."

== Track listing ==
Composed by Herbie Nichols.

1. "Moments Magical" – 5:49
2. "Enrapture" – 5:21
3. "Delights" – 7:29
4. "Blue Shout" – 4:42
5. "Strange City" – 4:38
6. "Karna Kangi" – 5:11
7. "The Happenings" – 3:36
8. "Change of Season" – 5:23
9. "Some Wandering Bushmen" – 6:39
10. "Shuffle Montgomery" – 5:00

== Personnel ==
- Frank Kimbrough – piano
- Ben Allison – double bass
- Ted Nash – tenor saxophone
- Michael Blake – soprano saxophone
- Ron Horton – trumpet, flugelhorn
- Wycliffe Gordon – trombone
- Matt Wilson – drums
