= Medicine Wheel (album) =

Studio album by Ben Allison
- Released: 1998
- Genre: Jazz
- Label: Palmetto

Ben Allison chronology
Seven Arrows (1996)	Medicine Wheel (1998)	Third Eye (1999)

Medicine Wheel is an album by bassist Ben Allison that was released by Palmetto in 1998.

== Critical reception ==
Professional ratings
Review scores
Source	Rating
All About Jazz	5/5 stars
AllMusic	4/5 stars
The Encyclopedia of Popular Music	3/5 stars
The Penguin Guide to Jazz Recordings	3/4 stars

All About Jazz called the album a "watershed moment in end of the century East Coast jazz."

== Track listing ==
All compositions by Ben Allison.

1. Spy
2. Mousetrap
3. Buzz
4. Apostles of the Ugly
5. Blabbermouth
6. Spy (detail)
7. Quirky Dungeon
8. Tiny C

== Personnel ==
- Ben Allison – bass
- Ron Horton – trumpet, flugelhorn
- Michael Blake – saxophone
- Ted Nash – saxophone, flute
- Frank Kimbrough – piano, prepared piano
- Tomas Ulrich – cello
- Jeff Ballard – drums
