= William Schimmel =

American musician (born 1946)

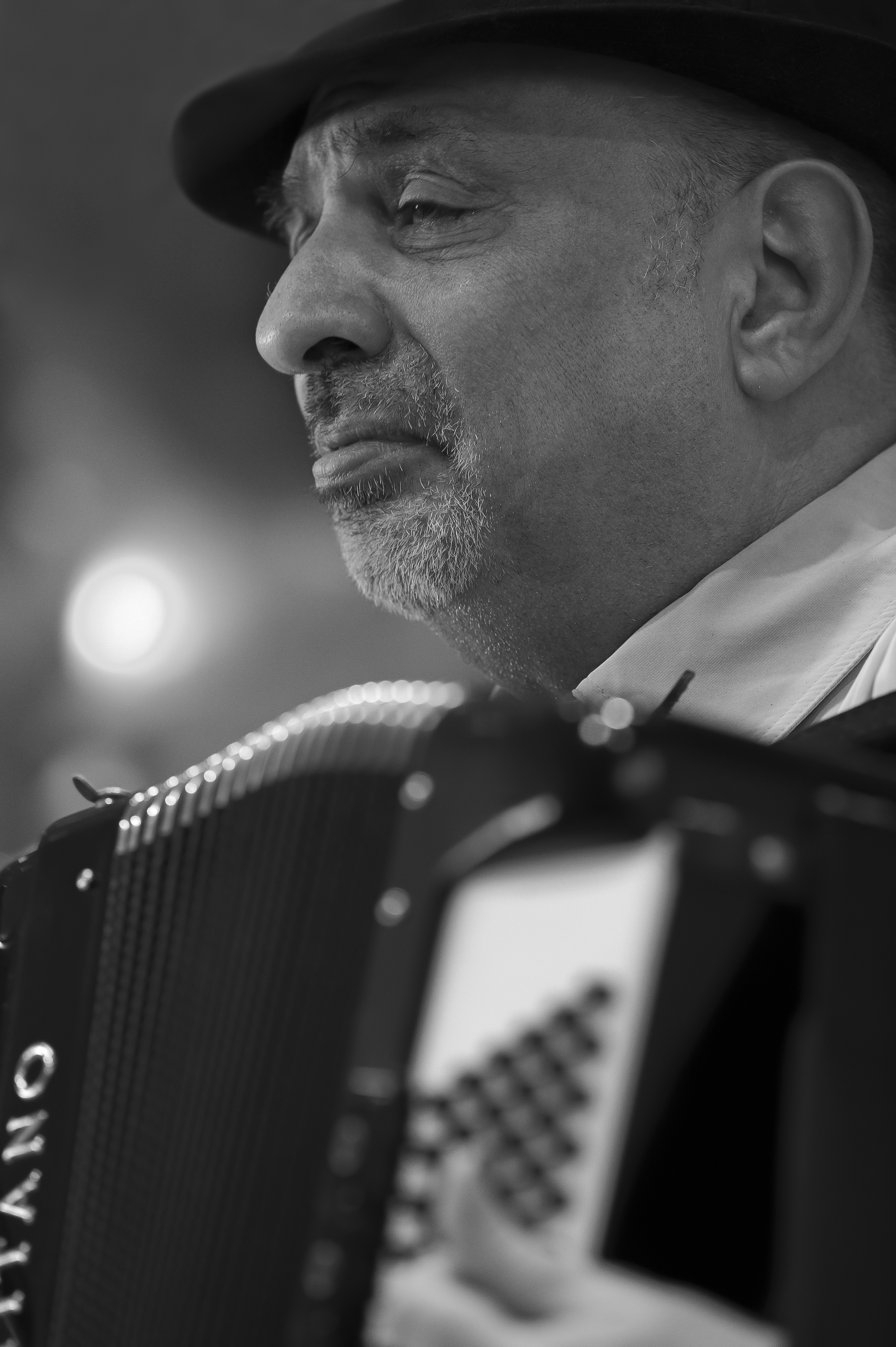
William Schimmel Buffalo, NY

William Schimmel (born 1946) is an American musician and composer, who plays the accordion and is a promoter of the philosophy of "Musical Reality" (composition with pre-existing music). He holds Bachelor of Music, Master of Science and Doctor of Musical Arts degrees in composition from the Juilliard School, along with a diploma from the Neupauer Conservatory of Music in performance/composition. He is a major popularizer of the accordion, performs music in many genres, has commissioned and premiered hundreds of new works, has composed over 4000 works in every medium, has written a number of books and articles and has made numerous recordings and videos. He has composed over 4000 works in every medium including opera which have been performed by leading performers, ensembles and conductors including the Late Leopold Stokowski. His music has been featured in a number of films, most notably Scent of a Woman starring Al Pacino, where he appears in the famous Tango Scene with The Tango Project which he is a founding member and television shows as The Good Fight, Ray Donovan, Quantum Leap and more.

== Awards ==
He received a Composers' Citation from The American Accordionists' Association in honor of his composition, "The Spring Street Ritual", which was the test piece for the 1979 Coupe Mondiale World Competition. He received The Confédération internationale des accordéonistes Merit Award for his contributions as a composer, performer and philosopher on the international accordion scene. He received a Merit Award from the American Accordionists' Association for his contributions spanning fifty years plus the "Accordionist of the Year" Award in 1988. He received the Keyboard magazine readers' poll award in 1992 as "Best Accordionist". He has served and continues to serve as Artist in Residence of The American Accordionist's where he also serves as Distinguished Lecturer in Residence and member of the Governing Board. National Public Radio called Schimmel the world's greatest accordionist. New Yorker Magazine called him Gotham's Happy Warrior of the Accordion. Accordion Star Illustrated Magazine called him the World's most important accordionist and inducted him into the American Accordion Hall of fame. Schimmel won the Stereo Review Album of the year award, and was nominated for a Grammy award. While at Juilliard, Schimmel was awarded two teaching fellowships and twice awarded the Rodgers and Hammerstein Scholarship in composition. Schimmel is also the recipient of Grants from The American Music Center, International Society for Contemporary Music, Meet the Composer and I-Park.

== Performances ==
He has performed with most major symphony orchestras in the U.S., including The Kirov, Israel, Vienna has been performing with the New York Philharmonic for 45 years, has a long performing and recording relationship with the Minnesota Orchestra, virtually every chamber group in New York, The Met and City Opera as well as with rock (most notably Tom Waits), jazz (most notably Ted Nash's Odeon and The Jazz at Lincoln Center orchestra), and avant-garde groups (including ICE, Talea, The Absolute Ensemble, North South Consonance, Composers Concordance, Orchestra of St. Lukes, Music from Japan and The Argento Ensemble). In addition, he has appeared on numerous radio programs as a guest performer and commentator, including New Sounds with John Schaffer and Fresh Air with Terry Gross (as well as Best of Fresh Air) and now co - hosts, with Brian Dewan, his own internet radio show, The Old In and Out, on WS Accordion Radio.

== Academic work ==
Schimmel conducts a yearly three-day Master Class and Concert Series (The Seminars) sponsored by the American Accordionists' Association, now sponsored by The Accordion Global Association, dedicated to the exploration and establishment of an accordion culture, which is in its thirty first season. He recently curated a six day accordion event, Accordion Mixology, at Lincoln Center in celebration on the acquisition of his archives. This was followed by Not Entirely Schubert, a Concert with his Associates, What's Tango about the Classics and the upcoming, Improving on Berlioz. He has served on the faculties of numerous colleges including The Juilliard School, Brooklyn College CUNY, Dean of Neupauer Conservatory, New York University, New School University and many others.

He is known as an authority of the music of Kurt Weill and has recorded all of Weill's music which includes the accordion.

== Personal life ==
He is married to dancer, choreographer, director and filmmaker, Micki Goodman. Together they founded the Studio Muse Dance/Music/Theatre Troup and produced concerts in the New York, New Jersey and Philadelphia area. They have collaborated on numerous videos which can be seen on You Tube. They have one son who is a visual artist.

== Discography ==
With Ted Nash

- Sidewalk Meeting (Arabesque, 2001)

With Tom Waits

- Rain Dogs (Island, 1985)
- Franks Wild Years (Island, 1985)

a complete listing of his recordings are available on www.billschimmel.com
