= Peace pipe (disambiguation) =

Peace pipe is a colonial, English-language misnomer for a ceremonial pipe used by some Native American cultures.

Peace Pipe may also refer to:

- Peace Pipe (Ben Allison album), 2002
- Peace Pipe (Redbone album), 2005
- "Peace Pipe", a 1975 song by B. T. Express
- "Peace Pipe", a 1993 song by Cry of Love
- Bowling Green–Toledo Peace Pipe, college football trophy in the Bowling Green–Toledo football rivalry
- Tiger-Sooner Peace Pipe, college football trophy in the Missouri–Oklahoma football rivalry

== See also ==
- Chanunpa
- Pipe smoking
- Tobacco pipe
