= The Herbie Nichols Project =

American jazz group

- Origin: New York City
- Genres: Jazz
- Years active: 1992–2001
- Labels: Soul Note, Palmetto
- Past members: Frank Kimbrough; Ben Allison; Jeff Ballard; Michael Blake; Wycliffe Gordon; Tim Horner; Ron Horton; Ted Nash; Matt Wilson

The Herbie Nichols Project was an American jazz ensemble dedicated to performing the music of composer and pianist Herbie Nichols.

== History ==
The group was co-founded in 1992 by pianist Frank Kimbrough and double bassist Ben Allison, both members of the Jazz Composers Collective. However, the origins of the project dated back to 1985, when Kimbrough began to research and transcribe Nichols' piano trio recordings. In 1991, Allison began assisting him, and the two continued their work until they had produced transcriptions for 38 recorded compositions, later adding 32 additional works transcribed from scores housed at the Library of Congress. Between 1995 and 2001, the group recorded three albums of music written by Nichols, with expanded arrangements that included instruments not featured on Nichols' original recordings.

== Legacy ==
Critic and author Ben Ratliff described the HNP as "a jazz repertory band that's done great work digging up the least-known, most fragmentary compositions of the pianist Herbie Nichols and turned them into music that does him proud." Writer A. B. Spellman commented: "Herbie would have been pleased, for he never heard the harmonic possibilities that he so carefully built into his pieces exploited by a band." The authors of The Penguin Guide to Jazz Recordings called the group "a vivid, inventive tribute band... which goes way beyond the vague, wannabe gestures of less thoughtful projects."

== Discography ==
- Love Is Proximity (Soul Note, 1997)
- Dr. Cyclops' Dream (Soul Note, 1999)
- Strange City (Palmetto, 2001)
