= The Stars Look Very Different Today =

Studio album by Ben Allison
- Released: 2013
- Genre: Jazz
- Label: Sonic Camera

Ben Allison chronology
Action Refraction (2011)	The Stars Look Very Different Today (2013)	Layers of the City (2017)

The Stars Look Very Different Today is the 11th album by bassist Ben Allison. It was released on Allison's own Sonic Camera label on December 3, 2013.

== Track list ==
All compositions by Ben Allison.

1. D.A.V.E. (Digital Awareness Vector Emulator)
2. Dr. Zaius
3. The Ballad of Joe Buck
4. Neutron Star
5. No Other Side
6. Kick It, Man
7. Swiss Cheese D
8. Improvisus

== Personnel ==
- Ben Allison – acoustic bass
- Brandon Seabrook – guitar, banjo
- Steve Cardenas – guitar
- Allison Miller – drums
