= Frank Kimbrough =

American jazz pianist (1956–2020)

Frank Kimbrough (November 2, 1956 – December 30, 2020) was an American post-bop jazz pianist and composer. He was born and raised in Roxboro, North Carolina. He did some work at Chapel Hill before moving to Washington, D.C., in 1980 and then to New York City in 1981.

== Biography ==
Kimbrough started playing the piano at the age of 3, beginning with hymns and then moving on to studies of classical music and his own improvised pieces; however, in rural North Carolina, he had no exposure to jazz until his mid-teens. As he recalled:

I didn't become exposed to jazz until I was probably around 14 or 15, and it was on PBS: the Bill Evans Trio. I remember it like it was yesterday. Because there it was, the discipline of the classical stuff that I'd been working on, and the freedom of improvising and just playing. There had always been this dichotomy between pop music and my classical studies, a very clear line. This was a great way to take the parts that I loved in each of those and channel them into one thing. That was it.

In addition to Evans, his main influences included Herbie Nichols, Thelonious Monk, Vince Guaraldi, Keith Jarrett, Cecil Taylor, Paul Bley, and Andrew Hill. Outside of jazz, he acknowledged a particular fondness for the Catalan composer Federico Mompou and for shakuhachi music.

In 1985, Kimbrough won the Jacksonville Jazz Festival's Great American Jazz Piano Competition. Soon thereafter, he began a five-year solo gig at the Village Corner, a piano bar in Greenwich Village, playing for six hours four or five nights a week. After signing with Mapleshade Records, he released his first album, Star-Crossed Lovers, on cassette tape in 1986 and recorded his first CD, Lonely Woman, in 1988, although it wasn't released until 1995. Kimbrough often shifted labels but is mostly affiliated with Palmetto, for which he recorded the highly acclaimed trio albums Lullabluebye (2003) and Play (2005), which were remastered and rereleased together in 2022.

From 1992 to 2001, he was a member of The Herbie Nichols Project, a repertoire ensemble dedicated to performing both previously known and newly discovered works by the pianist and composer Herbie Nichols. Kimbrough also co-founded The Jazz Composers Collective with bassist Ben Allison.

Throughout his career, Kimbrough recorded albums with a cast of illuminates in the field of jazz music, including Michael Blake, Ron Horton, Joe Locke, Wynton Marsalis, Paul Motian, Paul Murphy, Ted Nash, Scott Robinson, and Kendra Shank. He also played in the Maria Schneider Jazz Orchestra and in Ryan Truesdell's Gil Evans Project. Schneider has noted of Kimbrough's playing with her orchestra:

Frank would create these improvised introductions and transitions that were just unbelievable. Sometimes I'd listen to this stuff and say, "This is a composition." And they were totally different every single night. He never repeated himself, ever. And we played five years of Monday nights, revisiting a lot of the same music. He would take these solos on specific pieces of mine, which were completely open. He could go anywhere. It blew me away. It still does.

Kimbrough was also a music educator, teaching piano at New York University during the 1990s, and became a professor at the Juilliard School in 2008. He was married for 31 years to the vocalist and composer Maryanne de Prophetis and recorded two albums with her.

Kimbrough's final and most ambitious recording project was a 6-CD set of the complete works of Thelonious Monk for Sunnyside Records. This collection includes 70 compositions by Monk, which is more of Monk's music than Monk himself recorded.

Following Kimbrough's death, apparently from a heart attack, Newvelle Records produced a digital tribute album, Kimbrough, in 2021 that features multiple ensembles covering 58 of his compositions. Contributors to the project include many musicians who performed and recorded with Kimbrough as well as piano peers such as Fred Hersch and Dan Tepfer. In addition, two Kimbrough recordings have been released posthumously by Sunnyside, Ancestors in 2021 and The Call in 2025.

== Discography ==
=== As leader/co-leader ===
Year recorded	Title	Label	Year released	Notes
1986?	Star Crossed Lovers	Mapleshade	1986	Solo (cassette only)
1987?	Double Visions	Mapleshade	1987	Duo, with Steve Williams (bass) (cassette only)
1988-12	Lonely Woman	Mapleshade	1995	Trio, with Ben Wolfe (bass), Jeff Williams (drums)
1995-05 & 1996-05	Love Is Proximity	Soul Note	1997	With The Herbie Nichols Project
1997-08	Saturn's Child	OmniTone	1999	Duo, with Joe Locke (vibraphone)
1997-09	Noumena	Soul Note	2000	Quartet, with Scott Robinson (tenor sax, baritone sax), Ben Monder (guitar), Tony Moreno (drums, percussion); in concert
1992-06 & 1997-12	Chant	Igmod	1998	Trio, with Ben Allison (bass), Jeff Ballard (drums)
1998-09	Quickening	OmniTone	2003	Trio, with Ben Allison (bass), Jeff Ballard (drums); in concert
1999-02	Dr. Cyclops' Dream	Soul Note	1999	With The Herbie Nichols Project
2000-09	Autumn	LoNote	2001	Duo, with Ron Brendle (bass)
2000-12	The Willow	OmniTone	2002	Duo, with Joe Locke (vibraphone)
2001-05	Strange City	Palmetto	2001	With The Herbie Nichols Project
2003-04	Lullabluebye	Palmetto	2004	Trio, with Ben Allison (bass), Matt Wilson (drums)
2005-04	Play	Palmetto	2006	Trio, with Masa Kamaguchi (bass), Paul Motian (drums)
2006-02	Verrazano Moon	OmniTone	2008	Duo, with Joe Locke (vibraphone)
2003-07 & 2007-03	Air	Palmetto	2007	Solo
2009-09	Rumors	Palmetto	2010	Trio, with Masa Kamaguchi (bass), Jeff Hirshfield (drums)
2010-07	The Call	Sunnyside	2025	Solo
2011-07	Live at Kitano	Palmetto	2012	Trio, with Jay Anderson (bass), Matt Wilson (drums)
2013?	Afar	ScienSonic	2013	Duo, with Scott Robinson
2014-05	Quartet	Palmetto	2014	Quartet, with Steve Wilson (saxophones), Jay Anderson (bass), Lewis Nash (drums)
2015?	Meantime	Newvelle	2015	Quintet, on vinyl
2016-05	Solstice	Pirouet	2016	Trio, with Jay Anderson (bass), Jeff Hirshfield (drums)
2017-06	Ancestors	Sunnyside	2021	Trio, with Kirk Knuffke (cornet), Masa Kamaguchi (bass)
2018-05&06	Monk's Dreams: The Complete Compositions of Thelonious Sphere Monk	Sunnyside	2018	Quartet, with Scott Robinson (various wind instruments), Rufus Reid (bass), Billy Drummond (drums); 6 CDs

=== As sideman/featured soloist ===
With Ben Allison

- Seven Arrows (Koch, 1996)
- Medicine Wheel (Palmetto Records, 1998)
- Third Eye (Palmetto Records, 1999)
- Riding the Nuclear Tiger (Palmetto Records, 2001)
- Peace Pipe (Palmetto Records, 2002)
- Buzz (Palmetto Records, 2004)
- Layers of the City (Sonic Camera, 2017)

With Dave Ballou

- Regards (SteepleChase Records, 2005)

With Michael Blake

- Drift (Intuition Music, 2000)
- Elevated (P&M Records, 2002)
- Tiddy Boom (P&M Records, 2014)

With Katie Bull

- Freak Miracle (Innova Recordings, 2010)

With Jeff Cosgrove

- Conversations with Owls (Grizzley Music, 2015)

With Maryanne de Prophetis

- A Glance (LoNote Records, 2005)
- Tell a Star (ENNA Records, 2016)

With Ron Horton

- Genius Envy (Omnitone, 1999)
- Subtextures (Fresh Sound New Talent, 2003)
- Everything Is a Dream (Fresh Sound New Talent, 2005)

With Joe Locke

- Beauty Burning (Sirocco Jazz Limited, 2000)

With Ted Nash

- Out of This World (Mapleshade Records, 1993)
- Rhyme & Reason (Arabesque, 1999)
- Still Evolved (Palmetto Records, 2003)
- The Mancini Project (Palmetto Records, 2008)

With Rich Perry

- Left Alone (SteepleChase Records, 1997)

With Noah Preminger

- Before the Rain (Palmetto Records, 2011)

With Maria Schneider

- Coming About (Enja, 1996)
- Allégresse (Enja, 2000)
- Days of Wine and Roses - Live at the Jazz Standard (ArtistShare, 2000)
- Concert in the Garden (ArtistShare, 2004)
- Sky Blue (ArtistShare, 2007)
- The Thompson Fields (ArtistShare, 2015)
- Data Lords (ArtistShare, 2020)

With Kendra Shank

- Wish (Jazz Focus, 1998)
- Reflections (Jazz Focus, 2000)
- A Spirit Free: Abbey Lincoln Songbook (Challenge, 2006)
- Mosaic (Challenge, 2009)

With Ryan Truesdell's Gil Evans Project

- Centennial (ArtistShare 2012)
- Lines of Color (ArtistShare 2015)

With Dawn Upshaw and Maria Schneider

- Winter Morning Walks (ArtistShare 2013)

== Literature ==
- Leonard Feather and Ira Gitler, The Biographical Encyclopedia of Jazz. Oxford/New York 1999, ISBN 978-0-19-532000-8
