= Think Free (Ben Allison album) =

Studio album by Ben Allison
- Released: 2009
- Genre: Jazz
- Label: Palmetto Records

Ben Allison chronology
Little Things Run The World (2008)	Think Free (2009)	Action-Refraction (2011)

Think Free is the ninth album by bassist Ben Allison. It was released on the Palmetto Records label in 2009.

== Track list ==
All compositions by Ben Allison.

1. Fred
2. Platypus
3. Broke
4. Kramer vs. Kramer vs. Godzilla
5. Sleeping Giant
6. Peace Pipe
7. vs. Godzilla
8. Green Al

== Personnel ==
- Ben Allison – Bass
- Jenny Scheinman – Violin
- Shane Endsley – Trumpet
- Steve Cardenas – Guitar
- Rudy Royston – Drums
