= Sidewalk Meeting =

Studio album by Ted Nash
- Released: June 5, 2001
- Recorded: October 23–24, 2000
- Studio: Loho Studios, New York City
- Genre: Jazz
- Length: 52:47
- Label: Arabesque; AJ-156
- Producer: Ted Nash

Ted Nash chronology
Rhyme & Reason (1999)	Sidewalk Meeting (2001)	Still Evolved (2003)

Sidewalk Meeting is an album by saxophonist Ted Nash which was recorded in 2000 and released on the Arabesque label the following year.

== Reception ==
Professional ratings
Review scores
Source	Rating
AllMusic	3.5/5 stars
The Penguin Guide to Jazz Recordings	3.5/4 stars

The AllMusic review by David R. Adler said "With Sidewalk Meeting, saxophonist Ted Nash premieres a new, highly unconventional group called Odeon. ... Odeon seamlessly integrates the different sides of Nash's musical personality (he's a member of both the maverick Jazz Composers Collective and the more conservative Lincoln Center Jazz Orchestra), and that's just the kind of bridge-building that modern jazz needs". On All About Jazz, Mark Corotto observed "Nash, a member of the Lincoln Center Jazz Orchestra, arranged this unique blend of music and instrumentation. His bass clarinet winds around the plunger trombone of Wycliffe Gordon, Miri Ben-Ari’s violin and William Schimmel’s accordion throughout. They open with Debussy mined from New Orleans by way of an Argentinean tango (read swinging). Nash whets your appetite for the possibilities of this band, then delivers". In JazzTimes, Aaron Steinberg wrote "On Sidewalk Meeting, Odeon demonstrates such a strong sound identity that when they cover Ellington’s “Amad” (from The Far East Suite), Monk's “Bemsha Swing” and even Debussy's “Premier Rhapsody,” they make it sound as if the material were written specifically for them".

== Track listing ==
All compositions by Ted Nash except where noted

1. "Premiere Rhapsodie" (Claude Debussy) – 9:06
2. "Jump Line" – 7:29
3. "Reverie" – 4:46
4. "Tango Sierra" – 7:58
5. "Sidewalk Meeting" – 4:25
6. "Amad" (Duke Ellington, Billy Strayhorn) – 7:25
7. "Bemsha Swing" (Thelonious Monk, Denzil Best) – 5:39
8. "Summer Night in the Deep South" – 3:16
9. "Sidewalk Meeting (Reprise)" – 2:43

== Personnel ==
- Ted Nash – tenor saxophone, clarinet, bass clarinet
- William Schimmel – accordion
- Miri Ben-Ari – violin
- Wycliffe Gordon – tuba, trombone
- Jeff Ballard (tracks 2, 4, 7 & 8), Matt Wilson (tracks 1, 6 & 9) – drums
