= Dr. Cyclops' Dream =

Studio album by The Herbie Nichols Project
- Released: 1999
- Recorded: February 18 and 19, 1999
- Studio: Tedesco Studio, Paramus, New Jersey
- Genre: Jazz
- Length: 56:23
- Label: Soul Note; 121333-2

The Herbie Nichols Project chronology
Love Is Proximity (1997)	Dr. Cyclops' Dream (1999)	Strange City (2001)

Dr. Cyclops' Dream is the second album by the Herbie Nichols Project, an American jazz ensemble dedicated to performing the music of composer and pianist Herbie Nichols. It was recorded during February 1999 at Tedesco Studio in Paramus, New Jersey, and was released later that year by the Soul Note label. Led by pianist Frank Kimbrough and double bassist Ben Allison, the group also features saxophonists Ted Nash and Michael Blake, trumpeter Ron Horton, and drummer Tim Horner.

== Reception ==
Professional ratings
Review scores
Source	Rating
AllMusic	4.5/5 stars
The Penguin Guide to Jazz	3.5/4 stars
The Virgin Encyclopedia of Jazz	3/5 stars

In a review for AllMusic, Ken Dryden wrote: "the date includes a wealth of Nichols' imaginative yet infrequently heard songs, plus a number of compositions recorded for the first time... Fans of the music of Herbie Nichols will be astounded by this rewarding CD."

The authors of The Penguin Guide to Jazz Recordings called the music "pretty substantial further evidence for Nichols's overlooked genius," and commented: "The use of blues and non-blues intervals is utterly distinctive and these players know exactly what they're dealing with."

Glenn Astarita of All About Jazz stated that the musicians "capture the proverbial spirit while putting an indelible stamp to the music of a man who during his tenure in jazz was often overshadowed by others, which to this day remains somewhat of a mysterious or forlorn notion... [they] take the music of Herbie Nichols into the twenty-first century as his music lives on through the eyes and ears of this estimable bunch! Highly recommended!!"

== Track listing ==
Composed by Herbie Nichols.

1. "Bartok" – 8:35
2. "It Didn't Happen" – 4:33
3. "Dr. Cyclops' Dream" – 7:50
4. "Swan Song" – 5:54
5. "Dream Time" – 1:58
6. "Valse Macabre" – 5:50
7. "I've Got Those Classic Blues" – 1:50
8. "Beyond Recall" – 5:00
9. "Bebop Waltz" – 5:33
10. "IDH" – 2:06
11. "Riff Primitif" – 6:17
12. "Cro-mag at T's" – 0:57

== Personnel ==
- Frank Kimbrough – piano
- Ben Allison – double bass
- Ted Nash – tenor saxophone, alto flute, bass clarinet
- Michael Blake – tenor saxophone, soprano saxophone
- Ron Horton – trumpet, flugelhorn
- Tim Horner – drums
