= Seven Arrows =

Studio album by Ben Allison
- Released: 1996
- Genre: Jazz
- Label: Koch

Ben Allison chronology
Seven Arrows (1996)	Medicine Wheel (1998)

Seven Arrows is the debut album by bassist Ben Allison. It was released on the Koch Records label in 1996.

== Critical reception ==
Professional ratings
Review scores
Source	Rating
AllMusic	4/5 stars
The Penguin Guide to Jazz Recordings	3/4 stars

AllMusic noted that, "while 'Dragzilla' and 'Cosmic Groove Slinky' use ostinato bass repetition, it is as a springboard for quirky, boppish melodies in the case of the former, and for heavy chords and Sun Ra-like punctuations in the case of the latter."

== Track listing ==
All compositions by Ben Allison.

1. Dragzilla
2. Reflections of Desire
3. Delirioso
4. Little Boy
5. Cosmic Groove Slinky
6. Forgetting, for Now
7. King of a One Man Planet

== Personnel ==
- Ben Allison – Bass, guitar
- Ted Nash – Saxophones
- Frank Kimbrough – Piano
- Ron Horton – Trumpet
- Tim Horner – Drums
