= Wycliffe Gordon =

American jazz musician, composer, and educator (b. 1967)

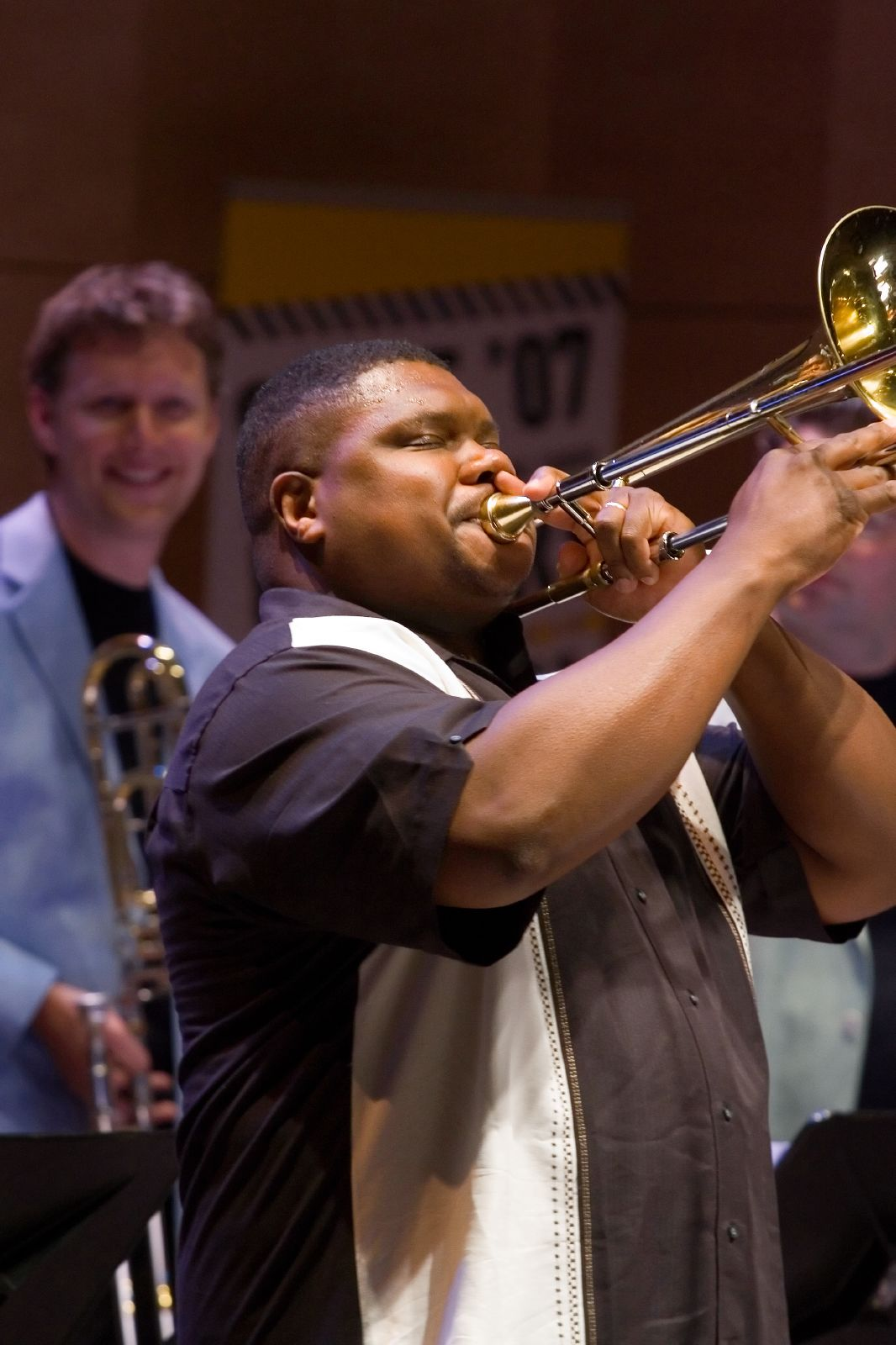

Background information
- Also known as: Pinecone
- Born: May 29, 1967 (age 59); Waynesboro, Georgia, U.S.
- Education: Florida A&M University
- Genre: Jazz
- Occupations: Jazz musician, composer and educator
- Instrument: Trombone
- Labels: WJ3, Chesky, Criss Cross
- Website: www.wycliffegordon.com

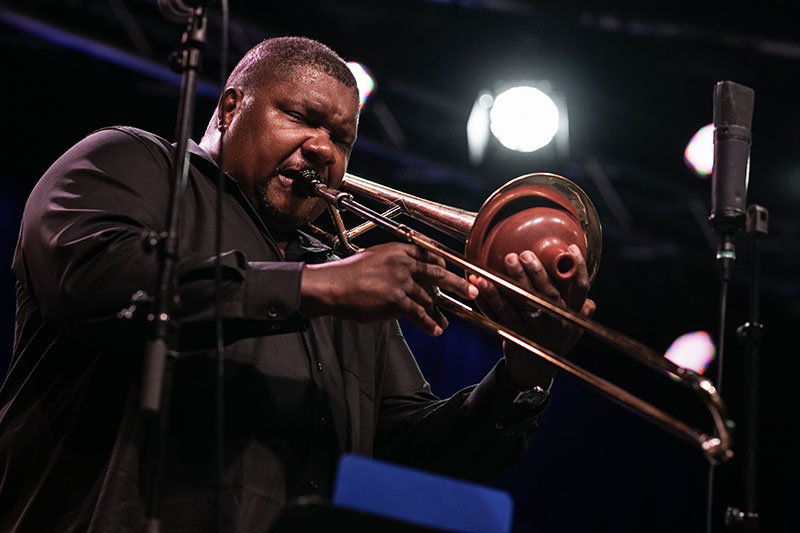
Gordon in Denmark, 2018

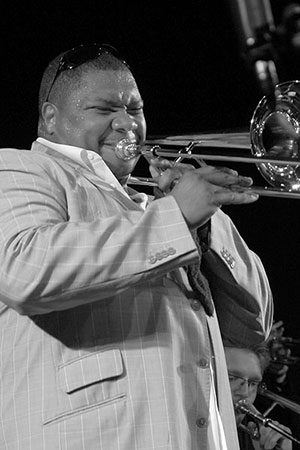
Gordon in 2008

Wycliffe A. Gordon (born May 29, 1967) is an American jazz trombonist, arranger, composer, band leader, and music educator at the collegiate-conservatory level. Gordon also sings and plays didgeridoo, trumpet, soprano trombone, tuba, and piano. His nickname is "Pinecone".

== Early life and education ==
Gordon was born in Waynesboro, Georgia, into a religious and musical background that influenced the early direction of his music. His father, Lucius Gordon (1936–1997), was a church organist at several churches in Burke County, Georgia and a classical pianist and teacher. Gordon took an interest in jazz in 1980 when he was 13 years old, while listening to jazz records inherited from his great-aunt. The collection included a five-LP anthology produced by Sony-Columbia. In particular, he was drawn to musicians such as Louis Armstrong and the Hot Fives and Hot Sevens.

At the age of 13, he was attending Sego Junior High School in Augusta, Georgia, where his band director was trombonist Don Milford. Gordon graduated in 1984 from Butler High School in Augusta. He performed in New York City as part of the McDonald's High School All-American Band. He then studied music at Florida A&M, where he played in the marching band.

== Career ==
His early works as a professional were with Wynton Marsalis, but in 2010 he has expanded beyond swing and has experimented with new instruments. The strongest example of this might be The Search where he plays didgeridoo and covers Thelonious Monk songs. He has also played Gospel music.

In 1995, Gordon arranged and orchestrated the theme song for NPR's All Things Considered. Gordon's arrangement and orchestration is the third version of the melody composed in 1971 by Donald Joseph Voegeli (1920–2009).

On September 24, 2004, Gordon conducted the Jazz at Lincoln Center Orchestra in the premiere of his new, original score for Body and Soul, the 1925 silent film directed by Oscar Micheaux.

He has recently gained more worldwide popularity, being featured in South Australia's Generations In Jazz 2016 and 2017, playing alongside artists such as James Morrison, Jazzmeia Horn, Gordon Goodwin and Ross Irwin among others. For more than a decade, he has also worked with visual artist and educator Ligel Lambert on numerous collaborative projects.

Gordon is currently an assistant professor at Augusta University in Augusta, Georgia, where he is the Director of Jazz Studies. He has been named the Jazz Trombonist of the Year 13 times by the Jazz Journalists Association, and Best Trombone by DownBeat magazine six times.

== Blues Back Records ==
Blues Back Records was an American independent jazz label founded by Gordon in 2006, coinciding with the release of his album Rhythm on My Mind, a collaboration with bassist Jay Leonhart. His desire for artistic control was the impetus for creating Blues Back. During a meeting with Leonhart, with Gordon's "I Want My Blues Back" playing in the background, the two laughed and decided on the name for the company. Blues Back produced other artists who met Gordon's criteria for originality. The company became inactive in 2011.

== Discography ==
=== As leader ===
- Bone Structure (Atlantic, 1996)
- Slidin' Home (Nagel-Heyer, 1999)
- The Search (Nagel-Heyer, 2000)
- The Gospel Truth (Criss Cross, 2000)
- What You Dealin' With (Criss Cross, 2001)
- We (Nagel-Heyerr, 2002)
- United Soul Experience (Criss Cross, 2002)
- The Joyride (Nagel-Heyer, 2003)
- Dig This!! (Criss Cross, 2003)
- In the Cross (Criss Cross, 2004)
- Cone's Coup (Criss Cross, 2006)
- Standards Only (Nagel-Heyer, 2006)
- This Rhythm on My Mind (Blues Back, 2006)
- A Tribute to Storyville (Sidney Bechet Society, 2007)
- We, Vol. 2 (WJ3, 2007)
- BloozBluzeBlues, Vol. One (Blues Back, 2007)
- Boss Bones (Criss Cross, 2008)
- You and I (Blues Back, 2008)
- I'm Glad There is You (Blues Back, 2010)
- Cone and T-Staff (Criss Cross, 2010)
- Hello Pops!: Tribute to Louis Armstrong (2011)
- The Word (Blues Back, 2012)
- Dreams of New Orleans (Chesky, 2012)
- The Intimate Ellington: Ballads & Blues (Criss Cross, 2013)
- Signature Series (2014)
- Somebody New (2015)
- Within These Gates of Mine (2016)
- The Co-Op (Brown Brothers Recordings 2017)

=== As sideman ===
With Faye Carol

- A Soulful Christmas (Getdown Records, 2026)

With Faye Carol

- Faye Sings The Blues (Getdown Records, 2026)

With John Allred

- John Allred & Wycliffe Gordon: Head to Head (Arbors, 2002)

With the B# Big Band

- United In Swing – Wycliffe Gordon with the B# Big Band (2019)

With Maurice Hines

- Maurice Hines: To Nat King Cole With Love (Arbors, 2006)

With Bob Kindred

- Bob Kindred Trio Live at Cafe Loup (Conawago, 2006)

With Wynton Marsalis

- Big Train (Columbia/Sony Classical, 1999)

With Ted Nash

- Sidewalk Meeting (Arabesque, 2001)

With The Herbie Nichols Project

- Strange City (Palmetto, 2001)

With Marcus Roberts

- Deep in the Shed (Novus, 1989)

With Randy Sandke

- The Music of Bob Haggart Featuring His Porgy and Bess Arrangements (Arbors, 2002)

With Ron Westray

- Wycliffe Gordon & Ron Westray: Bone Structure (Atlantic Jazz, 1996)

With Chip White

- Double Dedication
- More Dedications
- Personal Dedications & Percussive Tributes
