= Noah Preminger =

American jazz saxophonist

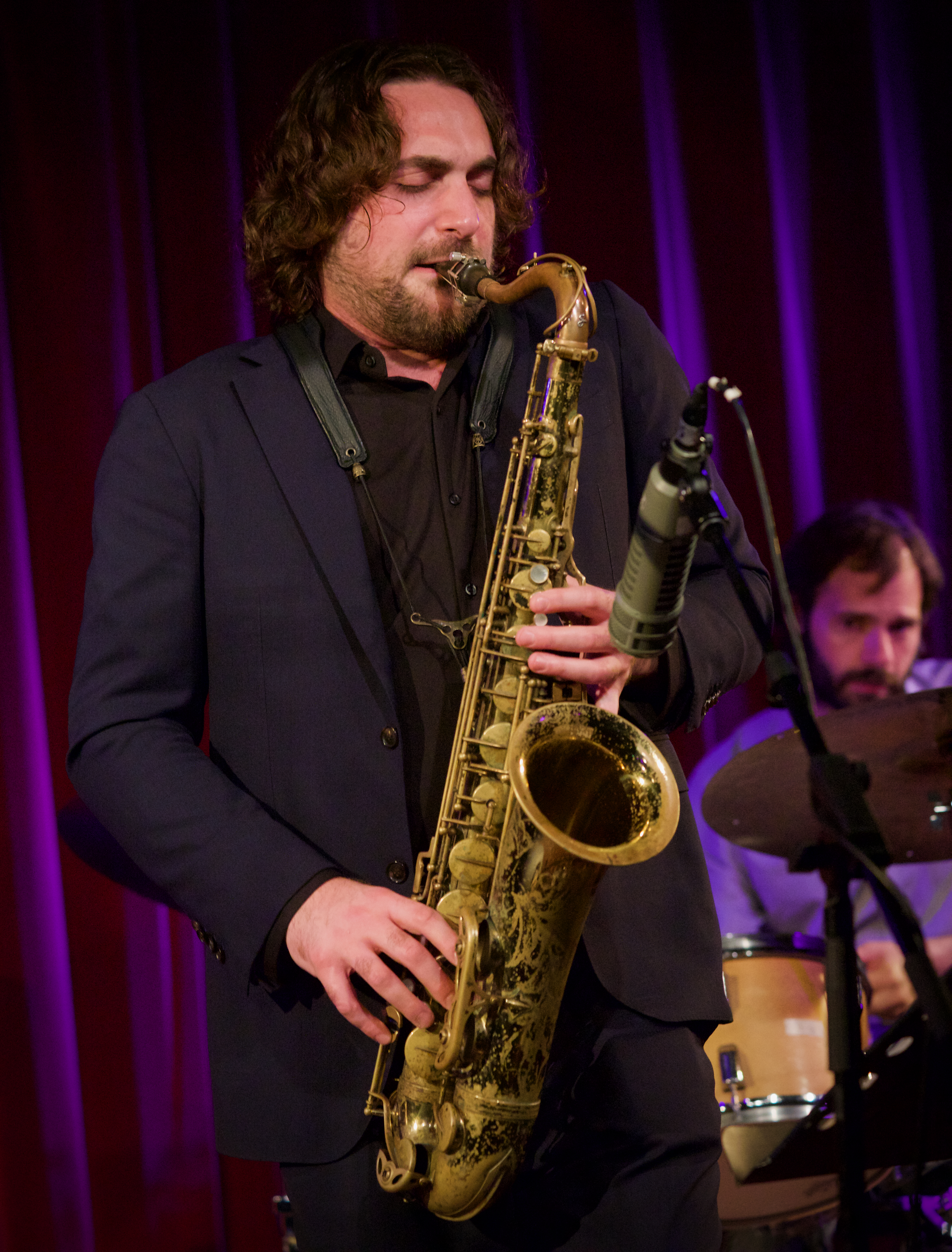

Background information
- Born: June 2, 1986 (age 40); Canton, Connecticut, U.S.
- Genres: Jazz
- Occupation: Musician
- Instrument: Saxophone
- Years active: 1994–present
- Label: Palmetto
- Website: noahpreminger.com

Noah Preminger (born June 2, 1986) is an American jazz saxophonist.

== Music career ==
Born in 1986, Preminger grew up in Canton, Connecticut. While in high school, he studied with saxophonist Dave Liebman. He released his debut album, Dry Bridge Road, after graduating from the New England Conservatory of Music. The album was a sextet session with Ben Monder, pianist Frank Kimbrough, trumpeter Russ Johnson, bassist John Hébert, and drummer Ted Poor.

Preminger's second album as a leader, Before the Rain, came in 2011 from Palmetto, featuring a quartet with Kimbrough, Hébert and drummer Matt Wilson.

Preminger has played with Billy Hart, Dave Holland, Fred Hersch, Dave Douglas, Victor Lewis, John and Bucky Pizzarelli, Billy Drummond, George Cables, Roscoe Mitchell, and Eddie Henderson.

== Critical reception ==
Of Brooklyn-based saxophonist Noah Preminger, the Hartford Courant said: "Playing with the grace and expressiveness of a jazz veteran, the young man with a horn mixes cool restraint with emotional depth and old-fashioned poetry with contemporary bite."

Jazz Review said: "Preminger seems to have arrived on the scene fully formed, with incisive musical instincts, a distinctive personal sound and an ability to write great tunes." The New York Times added: "More than just a promising starting point, this is a display of integrity; here's a musician you feel you can trust." Dry Bridge Road was named Debut of the Year in the Village Voice critics poll, making top 10 lists in JazzTimes, Stereophile and The Nation.

All About Jazz said about Before the Rain: "Sensitivity and an ear for aural sophistication are the hallmarks of tenor saxophonist Noah Preminger." Down Beat magazine said, "The creativity and passion remain extremely high," while The New York Times concluded: "Mr. Preminger designs a different kind of sound for each note, an individual destiny and story."

While he was a student, the Boston Phoenix said: "Preminger's sound is beholden to no one. That makes him continually unpredictable and continually satisfying."

== Discography ==
=== As a leader ===
Artist	Title	Label	Year
Noah Preminger X Max Light	Stitching Life	Chill Tone	2026
Noah Preminger	Ballads	Chill Tone	2025
Noah Preminger	The Dank	Dry Bridge Records	2023
Noah Preminger	Preminger Plays Preminger	Dry Bridge Records	2023
Noah Preminger	Sky Continuous	Criss Cross Jazz	2022
Noah Preminger	Songs We Love with Max Light, guitar	SteepleChase	2022
Noah Preminger	Thunda	Independent Release	2021
Noah Preminger	Contemptment	Steeple Chase	2020
Noah Preminger	Preminger Plays Preminger	Newvelle Records	2019
Noah Preminger	Zigsaw: Music Of Steve Lampert	Independent Release	2019
Noah Preminger	After Life	Criss Cross Jazz	2019
Noah Preminger	The Chopin Project	Connection Works Records	2018
Noah Preminger	Genuinity	Criss Cross Jazz	2018
Noah Preminger	Meditations On Freedom	Noah Preminger	2017
Noah Preminger	Some Other Time	Newvelle	2016
Noah Preminger	Dark Was the Night, Cold Was the Ground	Noah Preminger	2016
Noah Preminger	Pivot: Live at 55 Bar	Noah Preminger	2015
Noah Preminger	Background Music	Fresh Sound	2014
Noah Preminger	Haymaker	Palmetto	2013
Noah Preminger	Before the Rain	Palmetto	2011
Noah Preminger	Dry Bridge Road	Nowt	2008

=== As a sideman ===
Artist	Title	Label	Year
Michael Feinberg	Blues Variant	Criss Cross Jazz	2023
Frank Carlberg	Whispers and Cries	Independent Release	2019
Jason Palmer	Live at Wally's - Vol 1 & 2	Steeplechase	2018
Rob Garcia	Finding love in an oligarchy on a dying planet	Brooklyn Jazz Underground	2016
Julian Shore	Filaments	Tone Rogue	2012
Dan Cray	Meridies	Origin	2012
Rob Garcia	Drop and the Ocean	Brooklyn Jazz Underground	2011
Andre Matos	Quare	Inner Circle	2010
Rob Garcia	Perennial	Brooklyn Jazz Underground	2009
