= Steven Lugerner =

American jazz musician

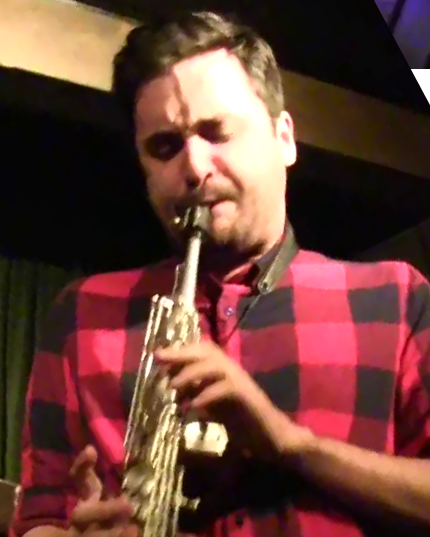

Steven Lugerner is an American, San Francisco-based jazz and classical musician. Lugerner attended the New School in New York City.

His debut solo album was the double-CD Narratives/These Are Words. These Are Words is a set of compositions based on verses in The Torah, and is played by Lugerner with trumpeter Darren Johnston, pianist Myra Melford, and drummer Matt Wilson. Narratives is played by a septet. Lugerner has since gone on to release multiple albums - Live at The Bunker (2012), For We Have Heard (2013), Gravitations Vol 1 featuring Angelo Spagnolo (2013), and Gravitations Vol 2 featuring Fred Hersch (2015). His Jacknife album used the compositions of Jackie McLean and was released in 2016.

Lugerner is Manager of Education Programs at the Stanford Jazz Workshop.
