= Rhyme & Reason (Ted Nash album) =

Studio album by Ted Nash Double Quartet
- Released: October 12, 1999
- Recorded: January 18–19, 1998
- Studio: Avatar (New York, New York)
- Genre: Jazz
- Length: 73:47
- Label: Arabesque; AJ-146
- Producer: Ted Nash, The Jazz Composers Collective, Billy Banks

Ted Nash chronology
European Quartet (1994)	Rhyme & Reason (1999)	Sidewalk Meeting (2001)

Rhyme & Reason is an album by saxophonist Ted Nash which was recorded in 1998 and released on the Arabesque label the following year.

== Reception ==
Professional ratings
Review scores
Source	Rating
AllMusic	4/5 stars
All About Jazz	3/5 stars
The Penguin Guide to Jazz Recordings	3/4 stars

The AllMusic review by Michael G. Nastos said "As an emerging improviser and thoroughly modern composer, Nash hits his stride with this startling recording, utilizing a double quartet of standard instrumentation and strings. ... Nash has created music that is jazz based but stretches into several different areas. It's new music in every sense, has a universal appeal, unquestioned high level musicianship, and intrigue. This is one you do not want to pass on. Highly recommended".

On All About Jazz, Douglas Payne noted "Ted Nash strives for something meaningful on Rhyme and Reason. Unlike other proclaimed and long-forgotten jazz events over the last few decades, Ted Nash has achieved something remarkable and lasting - just as the decade comes to an end", John Sharpe stated "At a time when the marketplace seems to be dominated by the sounds of "smooth jazz," it's encouraging to know that recordings such as these are still being produced. Saxophonist Ted Nash, who grew up in a very musical family, composed and arranged the entire CD and it's an ambitious, challenging piece of work", and Glenn Astarita observed "On Rhyme & Reason, the “Ted Nash Double Quartet”, is a finely tuned music machine, led by Nash’ multifaceted horn work along with on-target ensemble work and brisk arrangements. ... an extremely impressive release. Rhyme and Reason has staying power! Nash’ ability to entertain and sustain interest lies within his sharp arrangements, memorably melodic compositions and strong leadership qualities. Razor sharp soloing and ensemble work aside, Rhyme & Reason offers the complete package as it all sounds so natural and effortless".

In JazzTimes, Bill Bennett wrote "This recording demonstrates that the range of what might be called chamber jazz is just as broad as that of its classical cousin. ... Nash has created some stunning settings for improvisation. His playing is broadly sourced and often inspired".

== Track listing ==
All compositions by Ted Nash

1. "Apollo 9" – 8:31
2. "Rhyme" – 6:47
3. "Spirit Dance" – 8:49
4. "Longing" – 11:35
5. "Free Choice" – 5:28
6. "Sisters" – 11:24
7. "Prana" – 4:40
8. "Ishtar Gate" – 7:40
9. "The Trails" – 8:53

== Personnel ==
- Ted Nash – tenor saxophone, clarinet, alto flute, arranger
- Wynton Marsalis – trumpet (tracks 1 & 6)
- Frank Kimbrough – piano
- Ben Allison – double bass
- Tim Horner – drums
- Miri Ben-Ari, Joyce Hammann – violin
- Ron Lawrence – viola
- Thomas Ulrich – cello
- Erik Charlston – vibraphone, percussion
