= Monk's Dreams: The Complete Compositions of Thelonious Sphere Monk =

Studio album by Frank Kimbrough
- Released: November 23, 2018
- Recorded: May 22–24 & 28–30 and June 20, 2018
- Studio: Maggie's Farm Studio, Pipersville, Pennsylvania
- Genre: Jazz
- Length: 330:49
- Label: Sunnyside; SCC 4032
- Producer: Matt Balitsaris

Frank Kimbrough chronology
Solstice (2006)	Monk's Dreams: The Complete Compositions of Thelonious Sphere Monk (2018)

Monk's Dreams: The Complete Compositions of Thelonious Sphere Monk is a 6CD box set by jazz pianist Frank Kimbrough that was released by the Sunnyside label in 2018. The set features 70 compositions by Thelonious Monk.

== Reception ==
Professional ratings
Review scores
Source	Rating
All About Jazz	4/5 stars
All About Jazz	4.5/5 stars
PopMatters	7/10 stars

The All About Jazz review by Victor L. Schermer stated: "These musicians are to be congratulated for taking on the daunting task of recording all of Monk in back-to-back sessions ... On the whole, despite its limitations, this is a serious musical accomplishment. But the truth is that no one can recapture the excitement, originality, and creativity of the original Monk recordings. One must always return to them". On the same site Mark Sullivan observed: "These tracks are a sure attraction for Monk fans—along with the ability to hear all of Monk's compositions in one place—but they are not the only thing recommending this album. Above all else, Monk's Dreams is an exemplary collection of interpretations of the compositions and playing style of Thelonious Sphere Monk—perhaps the greatest iconoclast of twentieth-century jazz".

PopMatters correspondent Will Layman observed "You've never heard Monk played quite that way before. There are just enough moments like that on Monk's Dreams that you can stand to face the daunting task of hearing one man's version of every last Monk tune. Projects like this, of course, can inspire admiration more than passion. The desire to listen to the whole set at once is going to be rare, but the material is programmed with enough joy and intelligence that every disc is a stand-alone greatest hits package, with familiarity, variety, and just enough surprises".

In JazzTimes, Dan Bilawsky wrote: "The fact that these men had the stamina and discipline to accomplish such a feat in such a concentrated amount of time is a marvel in and of itself. And that’s to say nothing of the quality of what they created, which is incredibly high, and the level of respect within it, which runs deep. Walking a careful line, Kimbrough and his companions never obscure the master’s truths, muddy his language, or attempt to erect a revisionist playground. Fidelity is a foremost concern, as melodies, harmonies, and shape are largely honored. Kimbrough even adopts a more percussive touch than usual, hewing closer to Monk’s mannerisms. But that doesn’t mean creative thought is suppressed. This is anything but mundane Monk".

Jazz Journal's Andy Hamilton wrote: "Kimbrough’s own playing is outstanding, on occasion approaching Monk’s attack, and always aiming at the cool, compositional logic of his improvisations. ... My only cavil is that at least some of the time, the piano is slightly out of tune – not something that seriously mars a really excellent release".

== Track listing ==
All compositions by Thelonious Monk, except where indicated.

Disc 1: Thelonious

1. "Thelonious" – 4:51
2. "Light Blue" – 6:15
3. "Played Twice" – 4:41
4. "Ba-Lue Bolivar Ba-Lues-Are" – 5:00
5. "Ask Me Now" – 5:31
6. "Humph" – 4:36
7. "Bright Mississippi" – 5:50
8. "Reflections" – 5:02
9. "Bemsha Swing" (Monk, Denzil Best) – 4:41
10. "Teo" – 6:02
11. "Blue Sphere" – 4:22

Disc 2: Think of One

1. "Crepuscule with Nellie" – 2:28
2. "Think of One" – 4:28
3. "52nd St. Theme" (Monk, Coleman Hawkins) – 2:24
4. "Eronel" (Monk, Idrees Sulieman, Sadik Hakim) – 5:23
5. "Bluehawk" – 5:30
6. "Little Rootie Tootie" – 6:07
7. "Two Timer" – 3:17
8. "Ruby, My Dear" – 4:39
9. "Boo Boo's Birthday" – 5:11
10. "San Francisco Holiday" – 5:12
11. "Functional" – 4:24
12. "I Mean You" (Monk, Hawkins) – 5:05

Disc 3: Brake's Sake

1. "Shuffle Boil" – 5:42
2. "Monk's Dream" – 5:53
3. "Evidence" – 5:31
4. "Misterioso" – 3:54
5. "Four in One" – 6:00
6. "Brake's Sake" – 5:22
7. "Pannonica" – 4:17
8. "Bye-Ya" – 4:28
9. "North On the Sunset" – 2:45
10. "Introspection" – 3:59
11. "We See" – 4:49
12. "In Walked Bud" – 4:10

Disc 4: Locomotive

1. "Nutty" – 6:45
2. "Trinkle Tinkle" – 4:35
3. "Blues Five Spot" – 5:09
4. "'Round Midnight" (Monk, Cootie Williams, Bernie Hanighen) – 5:23
5. "Jackie-Ing" – 2:40
6. "Well You Needn't" – 5:40
7. "Sixteen" – 4:03
8. "Locomotive" – 4:37
9. "Gallop's Gallop" – 4:13
10. "Children's Song" – 4:47
11. "Blue Monk" – 6:44
12. "Friday the 13th" – 5:18

Disc 5: Off Minor

1. "Criss Cross" – 4:17
2. "Raise Four" – 3:35
3. "Let's Call This" – 5:07
4. "Who Knows" – 3:56
5. "A Merrier Christmas" – 3:40
6. "Stuffy Turkey" – 5:19
7. "Monk's Point" – 3:27
8. "Work" – 3:23
9. "Brilliant Corners" – 6:44
10. "Off Minor" – 3:46
11. "Hackensack" – 5:27
12. "Oska T" – 3:18

Disc 6: Coming On the Hudson

1. "Let's Cool One" – 5:57
2. "Hornin' In" – 4:24
3. "Coming On the Hudson" – 3:46
4. "Straight No Chaser" – 4:46
5. "Monk's Mood" – 5:09
6. "Green Chimneys" – 3:28
7. "Rhythm-A-Ning" – 5:36
8. "Ugly Beauty" – 4:32
9. "Skippy" – 3:41
10. "Something in Blue" – 4:43
11. "Epistrophy" – 4:25

== Personnel ==
- Frank Kimbrough – piano
- Scott Robinson - tenor saxophone, bass clarinet, bass saxophone, contrabass saxophone, sarrusophone, echo cornet, trumpet
- Rufus Reid − bass
- Billy Drummond - drums
