= Love Is Proximity =

Studio album by The Herbie Nichols Project
- Released: 1997
- Recorded: May 11, 1995; May 4, 1996
- Studio: Acoustic Recording, Brooklyn, New York
- Genre: Jazz
- Length: 1:03:12
- Label: Soul Note; 121313-2

The Herbie Nichols Project chronology
Love Is Proximity (1997)	Dr. Cyclops' Dream (1999)

Love Is Proximity is the debut album by the Herbie Nichols Project, an American jazz ensemble dedicated to performing the music of composer and pianist Herbie Nichols. It was recorded during 1995 and 1996 at Acoustic Recording in Brooklyn, New York, and was released in 1997 by the Soul Note label. Led by pianist Frank Kimbrough and double bassist Ben Allison, the group also features saxophonist Ted Nash, trumpeter Ron Horton, and drummer Jeff Ballard.

== Reception ==
Professional ratings
Review scores
Source	Rating
AllMusic	3/5 stars
MusicHound Jazz	4.5/5 stars
The Penguin Guide to Jazz	3/4 stars
The Virgin Encyclopedia of Jazz	4/5 stars

In a review for AllMusic, Ken Dryden noted that "Wildflower" is "richly voiced," but expressed surprise that "one of Nichols' best-known (but still relatively obscure) pieces, 'House Party Starting,' is omitted."

The authors of The Penguin Guide to Jazz Recordings called the album "arresting," and stated that "Love, Gloom, Cash, Love" is "particularly effective."

In an article for MusicHound Jazz, Garaud MacTaggart and David Prince described the recording as "spectacular," and wrote: "The album is an at times brilliant, but never less than excellent, sampler of what Nichols's music can sound like in the hands of talented musicians... Love Is Proximity proudly takes its place among the finest efforts of its kind, a glowing and important addition to Nichols's posthumous legacy."

== Track listing ==
Composed by Herbie Nichols.

1. "Trio" – 4:18
2. "Love, Gloom, Cash, Love" – 7:27
3. "Wildflower" – 10:20
4. "Infatuation Eyes" – 3:58
5. "Crisp Day/Blue Chopsticks" – 5:10
6. "Amoeba's Dance" – 7:00
7. "Love Is Proximity" – 9:12
8. "Wildflower 2" – 3:26
9. "Spinning Song" – 7:25
10. "Dance Line" – 4:56

== Personnel ==
- Frank Kimbrough – piano
- Ben Allison – double bass
- Ted Nash – tenor saxophone, alto flute, bass clarinet
- Ron Horton – trumpet, flugelhorn
- Jeff Ballard – drums
