= Peace Pipe (Ben Allison album) =

Studio album by Ben Allison
- Released: 2002
- Genre: Jazz
- Label: Palmetto Records

Ben Allison chronology
Riding The Nuclear Tiger (2001)	Peace Pipe (2002)	Buzz (2004)

Peace Pipe is the fifth album by bassist Ben Allison. It was released on the Palmetto Records label in 2002 and features Malian kora virtuoso Mamadou Diabaté.

Professional ratings
Review scores
Source	Rating
The Penguin Guide to Jazz Recordings	3.5/4 stars

== Track list ==
All compositions by Ben Allison, except where noted.

1. Third Rail
2. Slap Happy
3. Peace Pipe
4. Dakan (Mamadou Diabaté)
5. Goin' Back (Neil Young)
6. Disposable Genius
7. Music is Music
8. Realization
9. Mantra

== Personnel ==
- Ben Allison – Bass, Guitar
- Mamadou Diabaté – Kora
- Michael Blake – Saxophones
- Frank Kimbrough – Piano
- Mike Sarin – Drums
- Peter Apfelbaum – Saxophones
- Tomas Ulrich – Cello
