= Ron Horton =

American jazz trumpeter

Ron Horton (born 1960 in Bethesda, Maryland) is an American jazz trumpeter.

== Biography ==
Horton attended Berklee College of Music from 1978 to 1980. In 1982, he moved to New York City, where, as a longtime member of Jane Ira Bloom's band (1983-2000), he became an integral part of the jazz scene. He has also been a member of the New York Jazz Composers Collective since 1992 and the Herbie Nichols Project under Frank Kimbrough and Ben Allison. From 1998 to 2003 he was also a member of Andrew Hill's sextet, and appeared on his album Dusk (1999).

Horton worked as a sideman with Ted Nash, Allan Chase, Bill Mays, Jon Gordon, Andy Laster, Phillip Johnston, Matt Wilson, Roberta Piket, Rez Abbasi, Walter Thompson, Pete Malinverni, Jamie Baum, Bill Gerhardt, Rich Rosenzweig, John McKenna, Michael Jefry Stevens, Peggy Stern and others. In 1999, he released his first CD as a bandleader.

Horton also has given master classes and workshops at The New School in New York, the New England Conservatory of Music, the University of North Carolina, and Oxford University.

== Discography ==
- Genius Envy with Jane Ira Bloom, John McKenna, Frank Kimbrough, Ben Allison, Rich Rosenzweig, 1999, OmniTone
- Subtextures with Frank Kimbrough, Ben Allison, Matt Wilson, 2002
- Everything In a Dream with John O'Gallagher, Tony Malaby, Frank Kimbrough, Michael Sarin, Masa Kamaguchi, John Hébert, 2005, Fresh Sound

With Jane Ira Bloom

- Art and Aviation (Arabesque, 1992)

With The Herbie Nichols Project

- Love Is Proximity (Soul Note, 1996)
- Dr. Cyclops' Dream (Soul Note, 1999)
- Strange City (Palmetto, 2001)

With Samo Salamon

- Dream Suites Vol. 1 (Samo Records, 2025)
