= Lines of Color =

Live album by Ryan Truesdell's Gil Evans Project
- Released: March 2015
- Recorded: May 13–18, 2014
- Venue: Jazz Standard, New York City
- Genre: Jazz
- Label: Blue Note; ArtistShare
- Producer: Ryan Truesdell and Dave Rivello

Ryan Truesdell's Gil Evans Project chronology
Centennial (2013)	Lines of Color (2015)

Professional ratings
Review scores
Source	Rating
All About Jazz	4.5/5 stars
Exclaim!	9/10

Lines of Color is a live tribute album by the Gil Evans Project which is led by Ryan Truesdell. It was recorded in concert at the Jazz Standard in New York in May 2014. It earned the group a 58th Annual Grammy Awards nomination for Best Large Jazz Ensemble Album.

== Reception ==
Dan Bilawsky of All About Jazz rated the album 4.5 out of 5 stars. The website's Dan McClenaghan gave Lines of Color' 5 out of 5 stars.

== Track listing ==
1. "Time of the Barracudas" (Gil Evans and Miles Davis) - 8:54
2. "Davenport Blues" (Bix Beiderbecke) - 6:19
3. "Avalon Town" (Grant Clarke and Nacio Herb Brown) - 4:13
4. "Concorde" (John Lewis) - 7:49
5. "Cant We Talk It Over" (Ned Washington and Victor Young) - 4:13
6. "Gypsy Jump" (Gil Evans) - 3:19
7. "Greensleeves" (traditional) - 4:35
8. "Easy Living Medley" - 9:41
  "Easy Living" (Leo Robin and Ralph Rainger),
  "Everything Happens To Me"(Hoagy Carmichael and Johnny Mercer) and
  "Moon Dreams"(Johnny Mercer and Chummy MacGregor)
9. "Just One of Those Things" (Cole Porter) - 5:26
10. "Sunday Drivin'" (C J Norwood and John Benson Brooks) - 3:24
11. "How High the Moon" (Morgan Lewis and Nancy Hamilton) - 3:48

Track listing adapted from the iTunes Store

== Personnel ==
- Ryan Truesdell – conductor

Woodwinds

- Alden Banta – bassoon/bass clarinet/baritone sax
- Brian Landrus – baritone/clarinet/bass clarinet
- Dave Pietro – alto/flute/alto flute/clarinet
- Donny McCaslin – /flute/clarinet
- Jesse Han – flute
- Jessica Aura Taskov – flute
- Scott Robinson – tenor/clarinet/bass clarinet
- Steve Kenyon – flute/clarinet
- Steve Wilson – soprano/alto/alto flute/clarinet
- Tom Christensen – alto flute/oboe/English horn

Brass

- Augie Haas – trumpet
- Greg Gisbert – trumpet
- Mat Jodrell – trumpet
- Marshall Gilkes – trombone
- Ryan Keberle – trombone
- George Flynn – bass trombone
- Adam Unsworth – French horn
- David Peel – French horn
- Marcus Rojas – tuba

Rhythm

- Frank Kimbrough – piano
- James Chirillo – guitar
- Jay Anderson – bass
- Lewis Nash – drums

Plus

- Lois Martin – viola
- Wendy Gilles – voice
