= Michael Blake (musician) =

Canadian musician (born 1964)

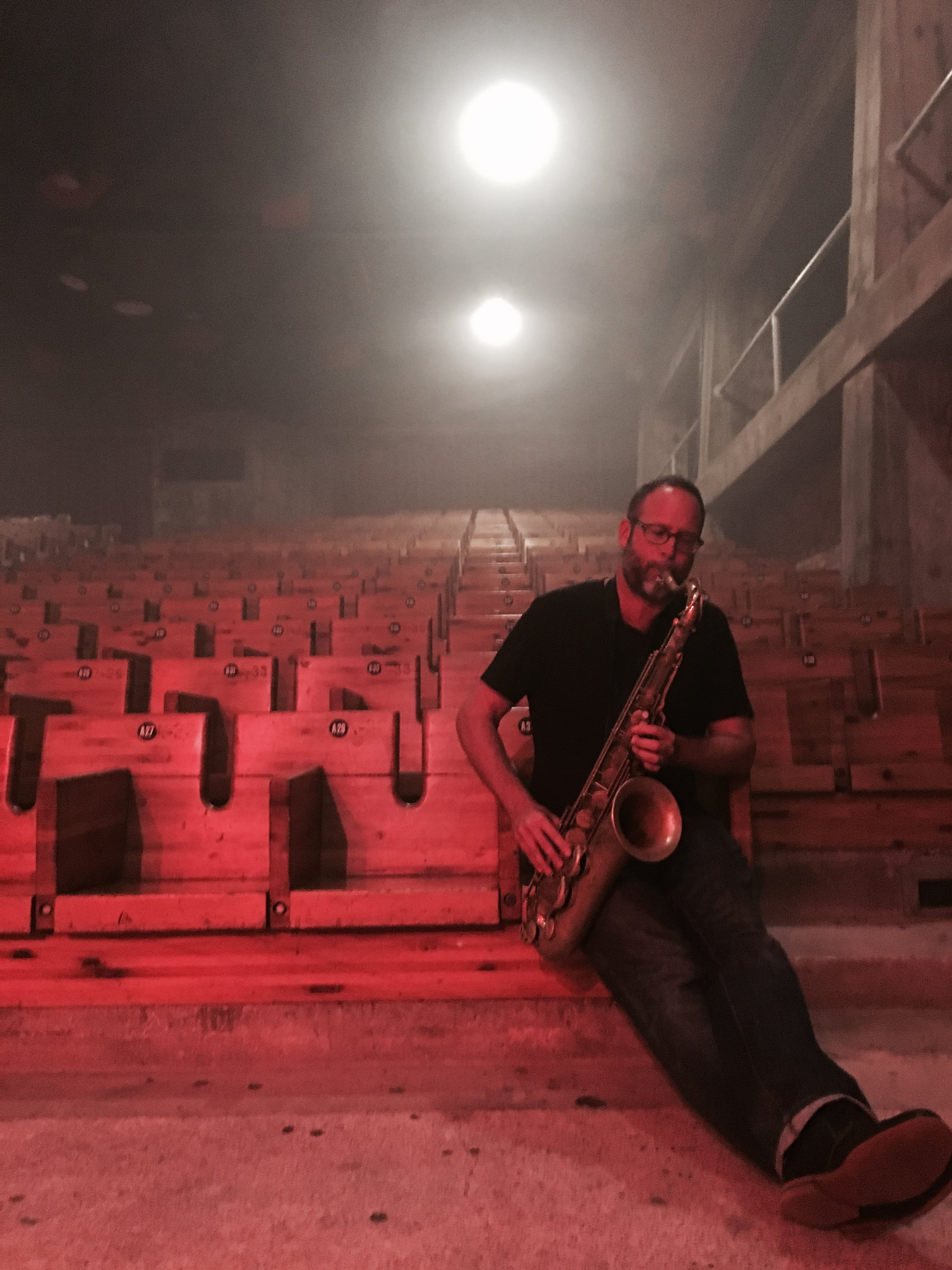
- Michael Blake in São Paulo, Brazil

Background information
- Born: Michael Stephen Blake; May 19, 1964 (age 62); Montreal, Canada
- Genre: Jazz
- Occupations: Musician, composer
- Instruments: Tenor saxophone, soprano saxophone, alto saxophone, baritone saxophone, clarinet, bass clarinet, flute, alto flute, piano
- Website: www.michaelblake.net

Michael Blake (born May 19, 1964) is a Canadian-American saxophonist, composer and arranger. Blake is based in New York City where he has led a robust career leading his own bands. As a sideman Michael has performed with Charlie Hunter, The Lounge Lizards, Steven Bernstein, Ben Allison and Ray LaMontagne. The New York Times jazz critic Ben Ratliff wrote,"Mr. Blake, on tenor especially, is an endlessly engaging improviser, and an inquisitive one".

== Early life ==
Michael Blake was born in Montreal, Canada. His mother Merle Stevens was a professional dancer in Montreal when she met his father Francis Patrick Blake. Michael's father moved the family to Vancouver and Toronto before taking a Public Relations job with the San Francisco Opera. In 1973, after his parents divorced, they resettled in Vancouver, Canada, where Michael briefly took lessons on violin and piano. At the age of 14, around the same time his older brother started playing alto saxophone, he picked up the clarinet. Michael started on the tenor saxophone in High School after reading the biography Chasin' the Trane about saxophonist John Coltrane. Blake graduated with a Music Award from Vancouver Technical Secondary School in 1982. From 1982 to 1984 Blake attended the Vancouver Community College Jazz and Commercial Music Program where he studied saxophone and clarinet with David Branter. After finishing the program, Blake studied privately with saxophonist Patric Caird. From 1984 to 1985 he attended summer jazz workshops at The Banff Center for Arts and Creativity, studying saxophone with Steve Coleman and David Liebman.

Michael began his professional career in Vancouver, performing with local jazz musicians Hugh Fraser, Phil Dwyer, John Korsrud, Jim Chivers and Kate Hammett-Vaughan. He also worked with west coast R&B acts, The Powder Blues Band and Rocket Norton. In 1986 Michael received a grant from the Canada Council for the Arts to live in New York City where he would study saxophone and theory with David Liebman.

== Career ==
=== The Lounge Lizards (1989–1999) ===
In the fall of 1989 Blake started performing with John Lurie and The Lounge Lizards, and for that band he began playing soprano saxophone. Michael toured, recorded, and performed with the band until 1999. He appeared on the albums Live in Berlin Vol 1 & 2 and Queen of All Ears and is featured in the Lounge Lizards concert film, John Lurie and the Lounge Lizards Live in Berlin 1991. Blake also played saxophone and clarinet on Lurie's TV series Fishing with John and film scores for Get Shorty and Excess Baggage.

=== 1990s ===
As well as his affiliation with The Lounge Lizards, Michael worked as a sideman in the 1990s with Jack McDuff, Charlie Persip, Gil Evans Orchestra, and singer Henry Fiol. He became a composer in residence for the Jazz Composers Collective in 1995 and joined the Herbie Nichols Project, a repertoire ensemble devoted to the music of pianist/composer Herbie Nichols. In 1998 Blake joined bassist Ben Allison's band with whom he would tour and record 7 albums.

In 1996 Michael signed with Intuition Music and released two albums. His debut album Kingdom of Champa (1997), a concept album about Vietnam, was engineered by Scott Harding and produced by Teo Macero. He reassembled the team of Macero and Harding to produce and mix his second release Drift.

In 1997 Blake formed a band with David Tronzo, Tony Scherr and Kenny Wollesen called Slow Poke. Between 1997 and 2001 Slow Poke recorded Slow Poke at Home and Redemption, performed in Canada and Europe. Slow Poke at Home was re-released in 2005 on Palmetto Records with two additional bonus tracks.

=== 2000s ===
Blake recorded and released Elevated in 2002 on Knitting Factory Records. The traditional quartet sound of Elevated piqued the interest of critics, landing him coverage in both jazz and news journals nationwide.

Sundance TV commissioned Blake to compose the theme and score for a new TV series hosted by film historian Richard Peña titled Conversations in World Cinema (2020–2021). Subsequently, Sundance hired him to write music for the cable channel's Network ID.

In 2003 the Canadian composer and bandleader John Korsrud commissioned Michael to compose new works for his Hard Rubber Orchestra. Blake subsequently presented his own big band called The Eulipion Orchestra during his artist-in-residence at the Jazz Standard in NYC. The orchestra featured NYC musicians described by NY Times jazz critic Ben Ratliff as, "from all over the map".

After winning the ear of the Portuguese avant-garde label Clean Feed Records Michael recorded Right Before Your Very Ears in 2005. His first trio album with bassist Ben Allison and drummer Jeff Ballard is a balancing act of both free jazz and original compositions.

Blake played soprano saxophone for the theme to The Backyardigans, a children's TV program produced by the Nick Jr. Channel with music by Evan Lurie and Doug Wieselman. From 2004 to 2010 he performed with members of The Lounge Lizards on many Backyardigans episodes and composed the underscore for six episodes.

Michael assembled the band Hellbent in 2006 with Calvin G Weston, Steven Bernstein, and Marcus Rojas. Violinist Charlie Burnham also performed with the group. Blake released the live album Hellbent in 2007.

Blake served as musical director for the Neil Sedaka '50 Years of Hits' Celebration at Lincoln Center's Avery Fisher Hall on October 26, 2007. The event was a fundraiser for the Elton John AIDS Foundation. Michael performed on saxophone and conducted the house band, backing up Sedaka and other artists who had hits by Sedaka including Connie Francis, The Captain and Tennille and Natalie Cole.

During the summer of 2008 Michael joined the band of Italian trumpeter Enrico Rava on his promotional tour for New York Stories (ECM Records). He was a last minute replacement for saxophonist Mark Turner after he suffered a hand injury.

In 2009, The Michael Blake Quartet, including bassist Ben Allison, guitarist Steve Cardenas and drummer Rudy Royston, performed at City Winery's Wine & Jazz series.

==== The Danish sessions (2002–2008) ====
In 2002 Michael recorded Blake Tartare with Danish musicians Kresten Osgood, Soren Kjaergaard, and Jonas Westergaard. In 2005 he signed with the Danish jazz label Stunt Music to record More Like Us and The World Awakes (2008), a tribute to saxophonist Eli 'Lucky' Thompson. Blake Tartare, as the band became known played the Canadian Jazz Festival circuit, performed at the Berlin Jazz Festival and toured throughout Italy.

Under Kresten Osgood's leadership, Blake toured Denmark in 2002 and recorded a live album, Hammond Rens featuring organist Lonnie Smith.

Blake and Osgood reunited in New York City in 2008 to record Control This for Clean Feed Records. This was the only album on which he plays alto saxophone.

==== The Canadian sessions (2007–2016) ====
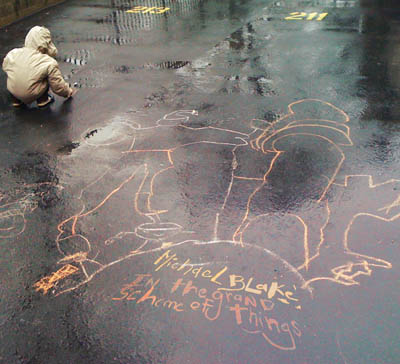
"The Computer" by Roland Blake

In 2007 Michael began a relationship with the Vancouver-based label Songlines. Collaborating with a younger generation of improvising musicians including Brad Turner, Chris Gestrin, Dylan van der Schyff and JP Carter, Blake's Canadian trilogy convey his compositional strengths as a story teller.

His first album for Songlines, Amor de Cosmos was dedicated to his grandfather Bert Stevens, who died at the age of 101.

In the Grand Scheme of Things (2012) makes reference to several of the saxophonists personal experiences, including his children and his brothers wedding in Zambia.

Fulfillment (2016) is about the ill-fated 2014 Komagata Maru incident in which Blake's great-granduncle Henry Herbert Stevens, a staunch anti-immigration MP, played a disruptive role. Created as a work of atonement, the album includes guest performances by cellist Peggy Lee, tabla player Neelamjit Dhilon and guitarist Aram Bajakian.

=== 2010s ===
Michael was on faculty at Siena Jazz Summer Workshop in Italy from 2009 to 2014. His role there included teaching ensembles, saxophone masterclasses and directing student recitals. He also performed in faculty concerts with colleagues including, Enrico Rava, Greg Osby, Kenny Werner, Steve Cardenas, Antonio Sánchez, Eric Harland and Ben Perowsky.

In 2013 Michael was funded by the Doris Duke Charitable Foundation to write Contrasts in Individualism: The Innovations of Coleman Hawkins and Lester Young. He recorded the music with Ben Allison, Frank Kimbrough and Rudy Royston and released Tiddy Boom the following year on Sunnyside Records. Blake wrote an analysis of his solo from the title track for DownBeat Magazine's Woodshed Department.

In 2015 Michael recorded Red Hook Soul (2016) for Ropeadope with Tony Scherr, Erik Deutsch, Ari Bortnick, Moses Patrou and Tim Lüntzel.

In the summer of 2016 Blake toured in Italy, performing music from Tiddy Boom. After that, he joined the faculty at the Tonica Workshop at the Jalisco Jazz Festival in Guadalajara, Mexico. Blake also brought his quartet to play at the SESC-Pompeia (São Paulo Metro) Jazz Festival in São Paulo, Brazil.

Throughout 2017 Michael performed with the Charlie Hunter Trio and recorded Live at the Memphis Music Mansion with Hunter and drummer George Sluppick.

=== 2020s ===
In 2020 Michael received a Canada Council of the Arts grant to conceive and record Dance of the Mystic Bliss, a concept album dedicated to the artist’s late mother. After the COVID-19 lockdown was lifted in New York City, Blake assembled a new group of musicians from Brazil, USA and Canada called Chroma Nova and recorded the music.

Blake rejoined his Lounge Lizards colleagues in 2021 and 2022 to record new music for John Lurie's TV Series Painting with John on HBO.

In October 2022 Michael released Comboblulate for Newvelle Records. He arranged 10 pieces of original music for the album which features a brass band with two tuba players Marcus Rojas and Bob Stewart, trombonist Clark Gayton, trumpeter Steven Bernstein and drummer Allan Mednard. Downbeat Magazine's Anthony Dean-Harris gave Combobulate 4 stars and wrote, "...when not blowing minds. They swing. They jam. They definitely impress on their own terms. But there's that extra oomph here that makes them exceptional like the other more genre-twisting tunes throughout the album. It's notable that this is an album playing on another level."

The same year Blake entered into a partnership with his brother Paul Blake and established P&M Records. They chose to make Dance of the Mystic Bliss their debut new release for 2023. The music was mixed by Kingdom of Champa engineer Scott Harding and features electric guitarist Guilherme Monteiro, string players Michael Bates, Chris Hoffman and Skye Steele and Brazilian percussionists Mauro Refosco and Rogerio Bocatto.

In 2026 Michael self released Piccolos Before Rifles, his second studio album with Chroma Nova, once again featuring Monteiro, Boccato and Steele with the addition of Giliard Lopes on bass.

Blake's 2026 holiday album Halloween Tales features the saxophonist with bassist Ben Allison, pianist Gary Versace and drummer Michael Sarin. It was selected by the London Times for their best new jazz list. Chris Pearson wrote, "although this spooky selection by Michael Blake might seem freaky, nothing could be more natural — or supernatural".

== Grant awards ==
Year	Award	Title	Organization	Project
2020	Grant	Explore and Create	Canada Council for the Arts	Compose, produce and record Dance of the Mystic Bliss
2017	Grant	Touring	Canada Council for the Arts	Red Hook Soul
2014	Grant	Production	Canada Council for the Arts	Compose, produce and record Fulfillment
2014	Grant	New Jazz Works	Chamber Music America	Contrasts in Individualism: The Innovations of Coleman Hawkins and Lester Young
2011	Grant	Touring	Canada Council for the Arts	The Variety Hour
2010	Grant	Touring	Canada Council for the Arts	Hellbent
2006	Grant	Touring	Canada Council for the Arts	Blake Tartare
2005	Grant	Commission	Canada Council for the Arts	John Korsrud's Hard Rubber Orchestra
2003	Grant	Touring	Canada Council for the Arts	Blake Tartare
2001	Grant	New Jazz Works	Chamber Music America	Mr Carefree
1986	Grant	B	Canada Council for the Arts	Study saxophone with David Liebman in New York City

== Honorable mentions ==
Dance of the Mystic Bliss was #3 in The Guardian's list for Best Jazz Albums of 2023.

In June 2023 Dance of the Mystic Bliss was selected by The Guardian's music critic John Fordham as Jazz Album of the Month.

Combobulate was selected as Best Jazz on Bandcamp, October 2022.

Red Hook Soul received 2016's Best Album Cover Art from The New York City Jazz Record

Fulfillment was selected 2016 Album of the Year by Bird is the Worm.

Tiddy Boom was included in Downbeat Magazine's 2014 Albums of the Year and made several Top 10 Jazz Albums of 2014 lists including Jazz Chronicles, The Chicago Reader and Lament for a Straight Line.

Hellbent was selected as Album of the Year in 2010 by Andrey Henkin at All About Jazz

Michael was selected in 2002 by DownBeat magazine's Critics Poll (Talent Deserving Wider Recognition) Categories for Artist of the Year, Tenor Saxophonist and Soprano Saxophonist

Drift was selected as 1999's Album of the Year by Germany's Jazzthing Magazine Critics Poll.

== Discography ==
=== As leader ===
- 1997 Kingdom of Champa (Intuition Music)
- 2000 Drift (Intuition Music)
- 2002 Elevated (Baby Tank)
- 2005 Blake Tartare (Baby Tank)
- 2005 Right Before Your Very Ears (Clean Feed Records)
- 2006 More Like Us (Baby Tank)
- 2007 Amor de Cosmos (Songlines Records)
- 2008 The World Awakes/A Tribute to Lucky Thompson (Stunt Records)
- 2010 Hellbent (Baby Tank)
- 2012 In the Grand Scheme of Things (Songlines Records)
- 2014 Tiddy Boom (Sunnyside Records)
- 2016 Red Hook Soul (Ropeadope Records)
- 2016 Fulfillment (Songlines Records)
- 2022 Combobulate (Newvelle Records)
- 2023 Dance of the Mystic Bliss (P&M Records)
- 2026, Piccolos Before Rifles (Baby Tank)
- 2026 Halloween Tales (Baby Tank)

=== As co-leader ===
- 1998 Slow Poke, Slow Poke at Home (Baby Tank)
- 1999 Slow Poke, Redemption (Intuition Music)
- 2009 Michael Blake/Kresten Osgood, Control This (Clean Feed Records)
- 2011 Michael Blake/Tommaso Cappellato/Stefano Senni, Live in Pisa (Punto Rojo)
- 2012 Michael Blake/Ben Allison/Rudy Royston, Union Square (A-Beat Records)
- 2016 Michael Blake/Samuel Blaser/Michael Sarin, Transmissions (For Tune Records)
- 2020 Slow Poke, Slow Poke at Home - Bonus Tracks (Baby Tank)

=== With John Lurie ===
- 1991 The Lounge Lizards, Live in Berlin, Vol.1 (Intuition Music)
- 1993 The Lounge Lizards, Live in Berlin, Vol.2 (Intuition Music)
- 1996 Soundtrack, Get Shorty (Verve)
- 1998 The Lounge Lizards, Queen of all Ears (Strange and Beautiful Music)
- 1998 Soundtrack, Excess Baggage (Prophesy)
- 1999 African Swim John Lurie (Strange and Beautiful Music)
- 1999 John Lurie, Fishing with John (Strange and Beautiful Music)
- 2000 John Lurie, The Legendary Recordings of Marvin Pontiac (Strange and Beautiful Music)
- 2024 John Lurie, Music from the Series, Painting with John (Royal Potato Family)

=== With Ben Allison ===
- 1998 Ben Allison, Medicine Wheel (Sonic Camera Records)
- 1999 Ben Allison, Third Eye (Sonic Camera Records)
- 2001 Ben Allison, Riding the Nuclear Tiger (Sonic Camera Records)
- 2002 Ben Allison, Peace Pipe (Sonic Camera Records)
- 2004 Ben Allison, Buzz (Sonic Camera Records)
- 2008 Ben Allison, Little Things Run The World (Sonic Camera Records)
- 2011 Ben Allison, Action-Refraction (Sonic Camera Records)

=== As sideman ===
- 1992 Justin Warfield, My Field Trip To Planet 9 (Warner Bros. )
- 1993 Ben E. King, Shades of Blue (Halfnote)
- 1993 Stereo MC's, Supernatural (G street)
- 1994 Rusty Cloud, Walkin' the Night (Moon Street)
- 1995 The Repercussions, Earth and Heaven (Warner Bros.)
- 1996 Rosco Gordon, Let's Get it On (Studio One/Coxsone Music)
- 1997 Rusty Cloud & S'killit, Blue Fever (Moon Street)
- 1997 Joe Gallant's Illuminati, Blues for Allah (Knitting Factory Records)
- 1997 London McDaniel, Anatural Aphrodisiaca (Nubile)
- 1998 Tricky, Angels with Dirty Faces (Island Records)
- 1998 Walter Thompson Orchestra, The Colonel (Nine Winds)
- 1998 Tim Otto's Pink Noise Saxophone Quartet, The Jig is Up (Pink Tomato)
- 1999 Chris Brown/Kate Fenner, Geronimo (Wolfe Island Records)
- 1999 Steven Bernstein, Diaspora Soul (Tzadik Records)
- 2000 Richard Bliwas, Walk the Bike (Rising Rose Records)
- 2000 The Herbie Nichols Project, Dr. Cyclops' Dream (Soul Note Records)
- 2000 Tony Scherr, Come Around (Smells Like Records)
- 2001 The Herbie Nichols Project, Strange City (Palmetto Records)
- 2001 Chris Brown/Kate Fenner, O' Witness (Wolfe Island Records)
- 2001 Richard Bliwas, Compose Yourself - Ten Improvisations (Rising Rose Records)
- 2002 Kresten Osgood feat.Lonnie Smith, Hammond Rens (ILK)
- 2006 Ray LaMontagne, Til' the Sun Turns Black (RCA Records)
- 2009 Tommaso Cappellato, Open (Elefante Rosso)
- 2010 Peter Scherr, Son of August (1hr Music/CDBaby)
- 2011 Giovanni Guidi, We Don't Live Here Anymore (CAM Jazz)
- 2013 Scott Neumann, Blessed (Origin Records)
- 2014 Henry Butler/Steven Bernstein and the Hot 9, Vipers Drag (Impulse! Records)
- 2015 Michael Bates, Northern Spy (Stereoscopic)
- 2016 Ryan Blotnick,Kush (Songlines)
- 2018 Greg Cordez, Last Things Last
- 2020 Allesandro Giachero/Franco Fabrini/Francesco Petreni, feat. Michael Blake, At the Fortress
- 2020 Rusty Cloud, Big Apple Ball
- 2020 Falkner Evans, Marbles (Consolidated Artists Productions)
- 2020 Chris McCarthy, Still Time to Quit (Ropeadope Records)
- 2021 Charlie Hunter, Live at the Memphis Music Mansion (Sidehustle)
- 2021 Tommaso Cappellato, Pioneered (Domanda)
- 2021 Various Artists, Kimbrough (Newvelle)
- 2022 Angie Glasscock, Moon Shine: The Land in Between
- 2022 Alexia Bontempo, Doce Carnival (Ropeadope)
- 2023 Jack Lacitra, Call Dr. John (Roots Recordings)
- 2023 Samuel Blaser, Routes (Enja)
- 2024 Chris Bergson, Comforts of Home (2 Shirts Records/Continental Blue Heaven)
- 2025 Richard Bennett, Scavenger (Ropeadope)
