= Allan Chase =

American jazz musician

Allan Stuart Chase is an American jazz saxophonist and teacher.

== Biography ==
=== Education and teaching ===
Chase was born on June 22, 1956, in Willimantic, Connecticut. Growing up in Phoenix, Arizona, he learned to play the alto saxophone and attended Arizona State University, where he got a Bachelors in Music in 1978. He then studied in the summers of 1978 and 1979 in Woodstock, New York, at the Creative Music Studio in Woodstock. He played with drummer Lewis Nash and then studied at Boston's New England Conservatory of Music from 1980 to 1981. In 1992 he got a Masters degree in Ethnomusicology from Tufts University (MA ethnomusicology, 1992); he wrote his thesis on Sun Ra.

Chase taught from 1981 to 1990 at the Berklee College of Music as an assistant professor. From 1993 to 1997 he taught at Tufts, from 1994 at the New England Conservatory, and in 1996 he moved to Boston again where he became chair of the jazz studies and improvisation department.

=== Music career ===
Chase was a member of Your Neighborhood Saxophone Quartet (1981–95), a cooperative group, and led various small groups. He was a sideman with and he worked as a leader of various small groups and as a sideman with guitarist Mick Goodrick, pianist Stanley Cowell, drummer Alan Dawson, and others, and was a member of the avantgarde big band Orange Then Blue. From 1992 on he was active in New York, playing with musicians including Phillip Johnston and John Zorn. He formed his own quartet in 1994, with trumpeter Ron Horton, bassist and guitarist Tony Scherr, and drummer Matt Wilson.
