= Ben Allison (musician) =

American double bassist, composer, and bandleader

Background information
- Born: November 17, 1966 (age 59); New Haven, Connecticut, U.S.
- Genre: Jazz
- Occupations: Musician, composer
- Instrument: Double bass
- Formerly of: The Herbie Nichols Project

Ben Allison (born November 17, 1966) is an American double bassist, composer, producer, bandleader, educator. In addition to his work as a performer, he co-founded the non-profit Jazz Composers Collective and served as its Artistic Director for twelve years. Allison is an adjunct professor at New School University and serves as President of the board of the New York chapter of the National Academy of Recording Arts and Sciences.

== Early life ==
Allison was born in New Haven, Connecticut. He began guitar lessons at the age of 9 at the Neighborhood Music School, in New Haven, Connecticut and privately with guitarist George Raccio. From 1983 to 1985, Allison studied West African, Haitian and Cuban drumming traditions with Richard Hill and attended the ACES Educational Center for the Arts (ECA), a performing arts school, and Wilbur Cross High School. In his senior year he studied briefly with bassist Steve Swallow and took classes in 20th-century music and early childhood development at Yale University. Allison entered New York University (NYU) in 1985 as a University Scholar to pursue a degree in jazz performance and bass studies. While at NYU he studied with Joe Lovano, Dennis Irwin, Jim McNeely and Steve LaSpina. Allison graduated from NYU in 1989 with a B.A. in Music Performance.

== Professional career ==
=== 1990s ===
In 1992, Allison and several colleagues formed the Jazz Composers Collective, a musician-run, non-profit organization dedicated to fostering the creation and performance of new music and building audiences for jazz. The Collective's annual concert series ran for 12 seasons and featured the work of 50 composers, the participation of more than 250 musicians and the premiere of more than 300 new works. Allison served as the Artistic Director of the Collective from its inception until its dissolution in 2005. Advisory Board members of the Collective included Dave Liebman, Joe Lovano and Andrew Hill.

The 1990s saw the release of Allison's first albums as a leader, beginning with Seven Arrows on Koch Records in 1996, which featured his original music. In 1998, he released Medicine Wheel, the first of nine albums for Palmetto Records. His second album for Palmetto, Third Eye, came out in 1999 and featured instruments rarely heard in a jazz setting, including the oud, cumbus, cello, and bass clarinet, along with the more typical piano, saxophones, trumpet, bass and drums. The album reached No. 1 on the CMJ jazz charts in September of that year and remained in the top spot for 9 weeks.

He also performed on recordings by Collective members Frank Kimbrough, Ron Horton, Michael Blake and Ted Nash, and recorded twice with noted saxophonist Lee Konitz. Allison was a key figure in the Herbie Nichols Project, a band made up primarily of Collective members. The band researched and performed the music of pianist/composer Herbie Nichols, releasing three albums: Love Is Proximity (Soul Note, 1996), Dr. Cyclops' Dream (Soul Note, 1999) and Strange City (Palmetto, 2001). The albums featured many previously unrecorded Nichols compositions unearthed by members of the group at the Library of Congress in Washington, DC.

Allison began working at New School University in 1996, serving as an adjunct professor and bass instructor. He also taught instrumental lessons and ensembles at the Third Street Music School.

=== 2000s ===
Allison continued his role as artistic director of the Jazz Composers Collective through 2005, when the members of the Collective decided that they had realized many of their initial goals and the organization was dissolved.

This was another busy period of recording for Allison, who released six albums as a leader for Palmetto between 2000 and 2009, including Peace Pipe (2002), which explored the fusion of jazz and West African music and featured Malian kora player Mamadou Diabaté; Cowboy Justice (Palmetto, 2006), which marked the beginning of his use of electric guitar as a dominant voice in his compositions and band sound; and Little Things Run The World, which NPR's Tom Vitale called "a turn to simplicity for a progressive jazz musician."

As a member of the Collective, Allison received numerous commissioning and performing grants from organizations including The Mary Flagler Cary Charitable Trust, American Composers Forum, Meet The Composer, Mid Atlantic Arts Foundation, Chamber Music America, The Aaron Copland Fund for Music, and The National Endowment for the Arts.

He performed on more than a dozen additional recordings as a co-leader or sideman, including albums by Curtis Stigers, Larry Goldings and Steven Bernstein.

In 2001, Allison wrote the theme for NPR's On The Media, produced by WNYC and currently heard weekly by 1.5 million listeners.

Allison continued his work at New School University and served as a guest instructor and visiting artist at the Siena Jazz Foundation in Siena, Italy, and at Souza Lima Ensino de Música in São Paulo, Brazil.

Allison won the Rising Star (Bassist) award in the Down Beat critics poll in 2005, 2006 and 2007. He was nominated almost every year in one or more categories: Bassist, Composer, and Rising Star Composer, Arranger, Artist, and Group.

In 2005, Allison received the Bird Award, issued by the North Sea Jazz Festival.

In 2009 Allison was invited to be a member of the Teaching Artists Collaborative at the Weill Music Center at Carnegie Hall. As part of this program, Allison taught musical fundamentals to children in the public school system in Harlem, New York City, using student-created poetry, spoken word and song.

=== 2010s ===
Allison continues to record and perform around the world. He released his ninth Palmetto Records album, Action-Refraction, in 2011. The album is unique among Allison's releases as a leader for its focus on non-original music. It contains reworkings of compositions by Donny Hathaway, PJ Harvey, Samuel Barber, Thelonious Monk, and Neil Young, among others. The album reached No. 1 on the CMJ jazz radio charts in May 2011.

In 2010, Allison was a visiting artist at the St. Louis College of Music in Rome, Italy, and returned as a teaching artist at the Sienna Jazz Foundation in Sienna, Italy.

In February 2012 Allison made his Carnegie Hall debut.

In 2012, as a representative of the Recording Academy (NARAS), Allison testified before the House Committee on Energy and Commerce on issues relating to performing rights.

In 2013, Allison formed his own record label, Sonic Camera Records. His first album on that label, The Stars Look Very Different Today, was released on December 3, 2013. The album features Brandon Seabrook (guitar and banjo), Steve Cardenas (guitar) and Allison Miller (drums). Allison wrote, arranged, produced and mixed the album.

== Personal life ==
Allison resides in NYC's Greenwich Village with his wife, Suzanne DiMaggio, and daughter.

== Discography ==
As a leader

Title	Year	Label
Moments Inside	2021	Sonic Camera
Quiet Revolution (CD)	2018	Sonic Camera
Layers of the City	2017	Sonic Camera
Quiet Revolution (vinyl)	2016	Newvelle
The Stars Look Very Different Today	2013	Sonic Camera
Action-Refraction	2011	Palmetto
Think Free	2009	Palmetto
Little Things Run The World	2008	Palmetto
Cowboy Justice	2006	Palmetto
Buzz	2004	Palmetto
Peace Pipe	2002	Palmetto
Riding The Nuclear Tiger	2001	Palmetto
Third Eye	1999	Palmetto
Medicine Wheel	1998	Palmetto
Seven Arrows	1996	Koch

As a sideman or co-leader (selected recordings)

- Ben Allison, Steve Cardenas, Ted Nash, Triological (Sunnyside Records, 2026)
- Michael Wolff, Sunny Day (Sunnyside Records, 2025)
- Matt Wilson, Good Trouble (Palmetto Records, 2024)
- Ben Allison, Steve Cardenas, Ted Nash, Tell the Birds I Said Hello (Sonic Camera Records, 2024)
- Ben Allison, Steve Cardenas, Ted Nash, Healing Power (Sunnyside Records, 2022)
- Steve Cardenas, Blue Has A Range (SunnySide Records, 2020)
- Dave Glasser, Hypocrisy Democracy (SunnySide Records, 2020)
- Ted Nash, West Side Story Songs (Plastic Sax Records, 2019)
- Michael Wolff, Bounce (SunnySide Records, 2019)
- Michael Wolff, Swirl (SunnySide Records, 2018)
- Pete Malinverni, Heaven (Saranac Records, 2017)
- Mark Whitfield, Live & Uncut (Chesky Records, 2017)
- Camille Thurman, Inside the Moment (Chesky Records, 2017)
- Jeremy Pelt, Tales, Musings and Other Reveries (HighNote, 2015)
- Michael Blake, Tiddy Boom (Sunnyside, 2014)
- Michael Blake, Ben Allison, Rudy Royston, Union Square (ABeat, 2013)
- Steven Bernstein's Millennial Territory Orchestra, MTO Plays Sly (Royal Potato Family, 2011)
- Steve Cardenas, West of Middle (Sunnyside, 2010)
- Steven Bernstein's Millennial Territory Orchestra, We Are MTO (Sunnyside, 2008)
- Ron Horton, It's a Gadget World (ABeat, 2007)
- Larry Goldings, Quartet (Palmetto Records, 2006)
- Ted Nash, In the Loop (Palmetto Records, 2006)
- Steven Bernstein's Millennial Territory Orchestra, Vol. 1 (Sunnyside, 2006)
- Michael Blake Trio, Right Before Your Very Ears (Clean Feed, 2005)
- Curtis Stigers, I Think It's Going to Rain Today (Concord, 2004)
- Frank Kimbrough, Lullabluebye (Palmetto R, 2004)
- Curtis Stigers, You Inspire Me (Concord, 2003)
- Ron Horton, Subtextures (Fresh Sound New Talent, 2003)
- Ted Nash, Still Evolved (Palmetto Records, 2003)
- Michael Blake, Elevated (Knitting Factory, 2002)
- Tom Christensen, Paths (Playscape, 2002)
- Ben Allison/Frank Kimbrough, The Herbie Nichols Project, Strange City (Soul Note, 2001)
- Michael Blake, Drift (Intuition, 2001)
- Ben Allison/Frank Kimbrough, The Herbie Nichols Project, Dr. Cyclops' Dream (Soul Note, 1999)
- Ted Nash, Rhyme & Reason (Arabesque, 1999)
- Ron Horton, Genius Envy (OmniTone, 1999)
- Frank Kimbrough, Chant (Igmod, 1998)
- Frank Kimbrough, Quickening (OmniTone, 1998)
- Ben Allison/Frank Kimbrough, The Herbie Nichols Project, Love Is Proximity (Soul Note, 1997)
- Lee Konitz, Rhapsody II (Evidence, 1993)
- Lee Konitz, Rhapsody (Evidence, 1993)
- Ted Nash, Out of This World (Mapleshade, 1991)
