= Steve Cardenas (musician) =

American jazz guitarist

- Born: Kansas City, Missouri, U.S.
- Genre: Jazz
- Occupation: Musician
- Instrument: Guitar
- Years active: 1978–present
- Labels: Fresh Sound, Sunnyside

Steve Cardenas is a guitarist who began his career in Kansas City, Missouri and has been part of the New York City jazz community since 1995.

== Career ==
Cardenas was a member of the Paul Motian Electric Bebop Band, Charlie Haden Liberation Music Orchestra, Steve Swallow Quintet, and Joey Baron's band, Killer Joey. He is currently a member of the Ben Allison Band, John Patitucci Electric Guitar Quartet, Jon Cowherd Mercy Project and Adam Nussbaum Lead Belly Project. Cardenas has also worked with Claude "Fiddler" Williams, Paul McCandless, Madeleine Peyroux, Norah Jones, Eliane Elias and Marc Johnson. He has toured throughout Europe, North and South America and Asia, performing at international music festivals, theaters, and clubs. Cardenas has released seven recordings as a leader.

Cardenas is on faculty at The New School for Jazz and Contemporary Music in New York City. He has been on the faculty at the California Institute of the Arts, Segunda Residencia Antonio Sánchez, Siena Summer Jazz Workshop, Stanford Jazz Workshop, Banff International Workshop in Jazz and Creative Music, and Brubeck Summer Jazz Colony. Cardenas is co-author, with editor Don Sickler, of the Thelonious Monk Fakebook, released by Hal Leonard Publishing.

== Discography ==
=== As leader ===
- Shebang (Fresh Sound, 2000)
- Panoramic (Fresh Sound, 2004)
- West of Middle (Sunnyside, 2010)
- Melody in a Dream (Sunnyside, 2013)
- Charlie & Paul (Newvelle, 2018)
- Blue Has a Range (Sunnyside, 2020)
- Healing Power (The Music of Carla Bley) (Sunnyside, 2022)
- New Year with Jim Campilongo (Sunnyside, 2023)

=== As sideman ===
With Ben Allison

- Cowboy Justice (Palmetto, 2006)
- Little Things Run the World (Palmetto, 2007)
- Think Free (Palmetto, 2009)
- Action-Refraction (Palmetto, 2011)
- The Stars Look Very Different Today (Sonic Camera, 2013)
- Layers of the City (Sonic Camera, 2017)
- Quiet Revolution (Newvelle, 2016 / Sonic Camera, 2018)
- Moments Inside (Sonic Camera, 2021)

With Jeff Beal

- Objects in the Mirror (Triloka, 1990)
- Three Graces (Triloka, 1993)
- Contemplations (Triloka, 1994)

With Paul Motian

- Monk & Powell (Winter & Winter, 1999)
- Europe (Winter & Winter, 2001)
- Holiday for Strings (Winter & Winter, 2002)
- Garden of Eden (ECM, 2006)

With others

- Paul McCandless, Premonition (Windham Hill, 1992)
- Paul Hanson, The Last Romantics (Midi Inc, 1993)
- Brandon Fields, A Coffeehouse Christmas (Positive Music, 1994)
- Tom Coster, From the Street (JVC, 1995)
- Joel Harrison, 3+3=7 (Nine Winds, 1996)
- Steve Million, Truth Is (Palmetto, 1998)
- Mark Isham, Miles Remembered (Columbia, 1999)
- Alexis Cuadrado, Metro (Fresh Sound, 2001)
- Rebecca Martin, Middlehope (Fresh Sound, 2001)
- Kate McGarry, Show Me (Palmetto, 2002)
- Mike Fahn, Close Your Eyes and Listen (Sparky, 2002)
- John Zorn, Voices in the Wilderness (Tzadik, 2003)
- Alexis Cuadrado, Visual (Fresh Sound, 2004)
- Rebecca Martin, People Behave Like Ballads (Maxjazz, 2004)
- Kate McGarry, Mercy Streets (Palmetto, 2005)
- Dave's True Story, Simple Twist of Fate (BePop, 2005)
- Charlie Haden Liberation Music Orchestra, Not in Our Name (Verve, 2005)
- Donny McCaslin, Give and Go (Criss Cross, 2006)
- Chris Potter, Song for Anyone (Sunnyside, 2007)
- Mike Holober & The Gotham Jazz Orchestra, Quake (Sunnyside, 2008)
- Jim Campilongo, Orange (Blue Hen, 2009)
- Adam Cruz, Milestone (Sunnyside, 2011)
- Roseanna Vitro, The Music of Randy Newman (Motéma, 2011)
- Monika Borzym, Girl Talk (Sony, 2011)
- Anthony Wilson, Seasons: Live at the Metropolitan Museum of Art (Goat Hill, 2012)
- Steve Swallow, Into the Woodwork (XtraWATT, 2013)
- Eliane Elias, I Thought About You (Concord Jazz, 2013)
- Jim Campilongo, Dream Dictionary (Blue Hen, 2014)
- John Patitucci, Brooklyn (Three Faces, 2015)
- Chris Cheek, Saturday Songs (Sunnyside, 2016)
- Charlie Haden Liberation Music Orchestra, Time/Life (Impulse!, 2016)
- Adam Kolker, Beckon (Sunnyside, 2017)
- Bria Skonberg, With a Twist (Sony/Okeh 2017)
- Jon Cowherd, Gateway (Newvelle, 2017)
- Adam Nussbaum, The Lead Belly Project (Sunnyside, 2018)
- Ted Nash, Somewhere Else (Plastic Sax, 2019)
- Kandace Springs, The Women Who Raised Me (Blue Note, 2020)
- Adam Nussbaum, Lead Belly Reimagined (Sunnyside, 2020)
- Steve Million, What I Meant to Say (Origin, 2021)
