= Ted Nash (saxophonist, born 1960) =

American jazz saxophonist, flutist and composer

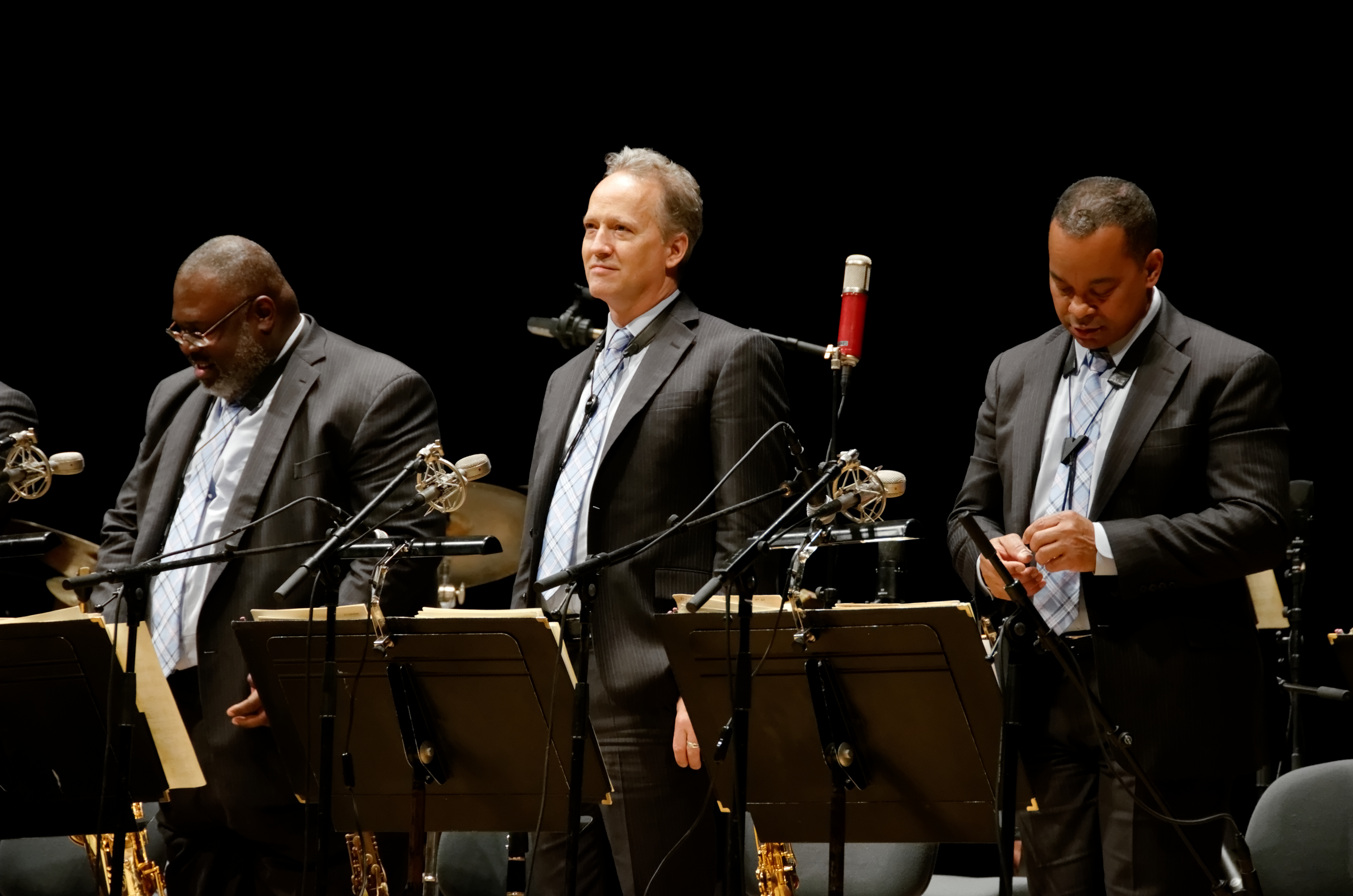
- Nash with the Jazz at Lincoln Center Orchestra, Lyon, France, 2016

Background information
- Born: December 28, 1960 (age 65); Los Angeles, California, U.S.
- Genres: Jazz
- Occupations: Musician; composer; arranger; bandleader
- Instruments: Saxophone; clarinet; flute; piccolo
- Years active: 1970s–present
- Labels: Concord Jazz; Mapleshade; Elabeth; Arabesque; Palmetto; Motéma
- Formerly of: Mel Lewis Jazz Orchestra; The Herbie Nichols Project; Jazz at Lincoln Center Orchestra
- Website: tednash.com

Ted Nash (born December 28, 1960) is an American jazz saxophonist, flautist, and composer. Born into a musical family, his uncle was saxophonist Ted Nash and his father is trombonist Dick Nash, both prominent jazz soloists and first call Hollywood studio musicians. Nash was a member of the Jazz at Lincoln Center Orchestra directed by Wynton Marsalis until 2024, and he is one of the founders of the Jazz Composers Collective.

== Music career ==
Nash grew up in Los Angeles. His father is trombonist Dick Nash and his uncle was saxophonist Ted Nash. Both were big band veterans, jazz soloists and session musicians who worked regularly with Henry Mancini and Les Brown. The younger Nash began his career on piano when he was seven years old, clarinet when he was 12, and alto saxophone at 13. At age 16, he played for one week with Lionel Hampton, and the following year, he was performing on saxophone with Quincy Jones, Louie Bellson, and Don Ellis. At age 18, he moved to New York City and joined the Gerry Mulligan Big Band. That same year, he released his debut album, Conception (Concord Jazz, 1978).

In the 1980s, he worked with vibraphonist Charlie Shoemake, who had been one of his teachers. He was a member of the Mel Lewis Jazz Orchestra, for whom he played saxophone and wrote arrangements. In the 1990s, he performed and recorded as sideman with Wynton Marsalis, Joe Lovano, and Ben Allison. Upon Allison's invitation, he joined the Herbie Nichols Project, a band which played the music of pianist Nichols.

Nash has been a composer, arranger, producer, conductor, and writer of liner notes. As a performer, he is a multireedist who has recorded on soprano saxophone, alto saxophone, tenor saxophone, clarinet, bass clarinet, flute, and piccolo.

== Compositions ==
His Portrait in Seven Shades is a seven-movement suite dedicated to seven modern painters: Claude Monet, Salvador Dalí, Henri Matisse, Pablo Picasso, Vincent van Gogh, Marc Chagall, and Jackson Pollock. The album was nominated for a Grammy Award.

Nash's album Presidential Suite: Eight Variations on Freedom (Motéma, 2016) consists of his compositions interwoven with historic political speeches by Winston Churchill, Ronald Reagan, Franklin D. Roosevelt, Lyndon B. Johnson, John F. Kennedy, Nelson Mandela, Jawaharlal Nehru, and Aung San Suu Kyi. The speeches are read by Sam Waterston, Wynton Marsalis, Joe Lieberman, and Glenn Close. In 2017, Presidential Suite won the Grammy Award for Best Large Jazz Ensemble Album.

== Discography ==
=== As leader ===
- Conception (Concord Jazz, 1980)
- Out of This World (Mapleshade 1993)
- European Quartet (Elabeth, 1994)
- Rhyme & Reason (Arabesque, 1999) – rec. 1998
- Sidewalk Meeting (Arabesque, 2001) – rec. 2000
- Still Evolved (Palmetto, 2003)
- La Espada de la Noche (Palmetto, 2005)
- In the Loop (Palmetto, 2006)
- The Mancini Project (Palmetto, 2008)
- The Creep (Plastic Sax, 2012)
- Chakra (Plastic Sax, 2013)
- Presidential Suite: Eight Variations on Freedom (Motéma, 2016) – rec. 2014
- Somewhere Else: West Side Story Songs (Plastic Sax, 2019) – rec. 2018
- Transformation with Glenn Close (Tiger Turn, 2021)

=== As member ===
The Mel Lewis Jazz Orchestra

- The Definitive Thad Jones (Limelight, 1989)
- The Definitive Thad Jones Volume 2 – Live from the Village Vanguard (Limelight, 1990)

The Herbie Nichols Project

- Love Is Proximity (Soul Note, 1996)
- Dr. Cyclops' Dream (Soul Note, 1999)
- Strange City (Palmetto, 2001)

Jazz at Lincoln Center Orchestra

- Live in Swing City – Swingin' with Duke (Columbia, 1999)
- A Love Supreme (Palmetto, 2005)
- Don't Be Afraid...The Music of Charles Mingus (Palmetto, 2005)
- Portrait in Seven Shades (Jazz at Lincoln Center, 2010)
- Vitoria Suite (2010)

=== As sideman ===
With Ben Allison

- Seven Arrows (Koch, 1996)
- Medicine Wheel (Palmetto, 1998)
- Third Eye with Medicine Wheel (Palmetto, 1999)
- Riding the Nuclear Tiger Medicine Wheel (Palmetto, 2001)
- Quiet Revolution (Sonic Camera, 2016) – rec. 2015

With Louie Bellson

- Raincheck (Concord Jazz, 1978)
- Sunshine Rock (Pablo, 1978)
- The London Gig (Pablo, 1982)
- Peaceful Thunder (Musicmasters, 1992)
- Black Brown & Beige (Musicmasters, 1994)
- Cool Cool Blue (Original Jazz Classics, 1994)
- Live from New York (Telarc, 1994) – live

With Don Ellis

- Music from Other Galaxies and Planets (Atlantic, 1977)
- Don Ellis Live at Montreux (Atlantic, 1978) – live

With Wycliffe Gordon

- The Search (Nagel Heyer, 2000) – rec. 1999
- Standards Only (Nagel Heyer, 2006) – compilation

With Wynton Marsalis

- Jump Start and Jazz (Sony Classical, 1996)
- Big Train (Sony Classical, 1999)
- Selections from Swingin' into the 21st (Columbia, 2011)

With others

- Loren Schoenberg Jazz Orchestra, Solid Ground (Musicmasters, 1988)
- Jimmy Heath, Little Man Big Band (Verve, 1992)
- Linda Eder, And So Much More (Angel, 1994)
- Vince Giordano, Goldkette Project (Circle, 1994)
- Joe Lovano, Celebrating Sinatra (Blue Note, 1996)
- Marcus Roberts, Blues for the New Millennium (Columbia, 1997)
- Tom Postilio, Dream (DRG, 1998)
- Anthony Wilson, Goat Hill Junket (1998)
- Freddie Hubbard, New Colors (Hip Bop Essence, 2001)
- Paul Weston, A Life in Music (JSP, 2009)[4CD] – compilation
- The Beach Boys, Made in California (Capitol, 2013) – box set
