= Palmetto Records =

American jazz record label

- Founded: 1990
- Founder: Matt Balitsaris
- Distributor: MRI/RED Distribution
- Genre: Jazz
- Country of origin: U.S.
- Official website: palmetto-records.com

Palmetto Records is an independent American jazz record company and label in New York City founded in 1990 by guitarist Matt Balitsaris.

Issues began with those by Balitsaris, then Greg Hatza in 1993. Since then, its catalog has included albums by Peter Bernstein, Joel Frahm, Larry Goldings, Andrew Hill, Cecil McBee, Dewey Redman, and Matt Wilson.

Balitsaris retired from music and began working for Fonkoze, a charity in Haiti. He was chairman of the board until 2015.

== Artists ==
- Ben Allison
- Lili Añel
- Matt Balitsaris
- David Berkman
- Will Bernard
- Betty Buckley
- Joey Calderazzo
- Frank Christian
- Scott Colley
- Richard Davis
- Marty Ehrlich
- Peter Eldridge
- Sara Gazarek
- Larry Goldings
- Greg Hatza
- Fred Hersch
- Andrew Hill
- Javon Jackson
- Frank Kimbrough
- Lee Konitz
- Brian Landrus
- Bill Mays
- Cecil McBee
- Leon Russell
- Kate McGarry
- Chris McNulty
- Mustard's Retreat
- Ted Nash
- New York Voices
- Noah Preminger
- Bobby Previte
- Dewey Redman
- Lonnie Smith
- Spectrum Road
- Steve Swallow
- Robert Walter
- Bobby Watson
- Matt Wilson
