= Gaylordsville, Connecticut =

Census-designated place in Connecticut, United States

- Census-designated place
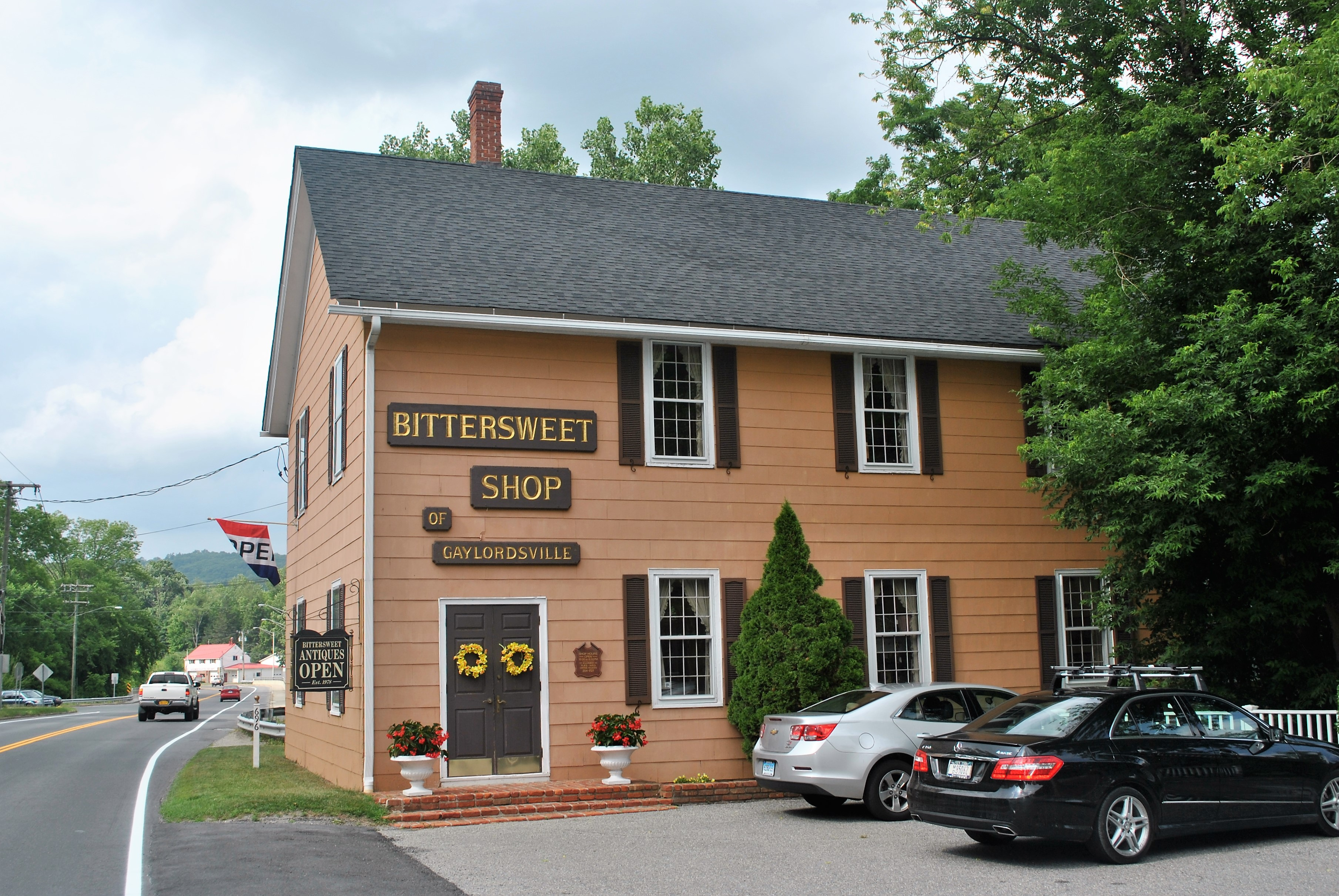
- Gaylordsville, Connecticut

- Location within Connecticut Location within the United States
- Coordinates: 41°38′40″N 73°29′2″W
- Country: United States
- State: Connecticut
- County: Litchfield
- Town: New Milford

Area
  - Total: 1.65 sq mi (4.27 km^{2})
  - Land: 1.59 sq mi (4.12 km^{2})
  - Water: 0.062 sq mi (0.16 km^{2})
- Elevation: 280 ft (85 m)

Population (2020)
  - Total: 660
- Time zone: UTC-5 (Eastern (EST))
  - Summer (DST): UTC-4 (EDT)
- ZIP Code: 06755
- Area codes: 860/959
- FIPS code: 09-30470
- GNIS feature ID: 2805982

Gaylordsville is a village (neighborhood/borough) in the northwest corner of the town of New Milford, Litchfield County, Connecticut, United States. It was listed as a census-designated place (CDP) prior to the 2020 census. As of the 2020 census, Gaylordsville had a population of 603.

== History ==
The early history of Gaylordsville is closely connected to the Gaylord family, early settlers in New England. In 1630 William Gaylord arrived in Dorchester, Massachusetts on the ship "Mary and John" along with his wife and five sons. A deacon in the puritan church, he was involved in the affairs of the colony, signing land grants and serving on the first jury in the colony. He later settled in East Windsor, Connecticut. His great-grandson, Ensign William Gaylord, moved to Woodbury in 1706 and married Joanna, the daughter of Captain John Minor. Joanna's sister, Grace, married Samuel Grant, and was an ancestor of President Grant.

In 1712, the Gaylord couple came to New Milford, Connecticut, which had been settled only five years previously. Their house stood on the corner of Main and Elm Streets. For a time he kept a tavern there in addition to doing his regular work as a surveyor. He did a lot of surveying for the State, laying out town boundary lines, and it was on one of these surveying trips that he became impressed with the large areas of level land several miles north of the New Milford village, just north of the straits on the Housatonic River. He began taking title to parcels of it, and soon owned a large part of the valley. To ensure the good will of the Native Americans living in the area, he also bought it from them, giving, according to legend, a horse, a mule, and a two-wheeled cart.

In 1722, a highway was laid out 'by marked trees' north from New Milford to the brook called Whemiseck. The blazed trail ran through Squash Hallow, past the straits, and over Cedar Hill. Mr. Gaylord was probably the surveyor who laid out this road, and probably put it over Cedar Hill so it would not cut into the level areas that were to become his fields.

In 1725, Mr. Gaylord travelled this trail from New Milford and built a log cabin west of the Housatonic just north of the straits. He lived in this cabin three years while he was clearing land, cutting timbers, and building his frame house, which he built in 1728. The following year his oldest son, Aaron, built a house about a quarter of a mile south of his father's, and on the west side of the valley.

During this time the Gaylord family became good friends with their Indian neighbors, teaching them better methods of agriculture, and dickering with them for furs they could use. The family consisted of Mr. and Mrs. Gaylord, Aaron, Joanna, Ruth, Benjamin, and Mary. Benjamin remained at his father's home, and eventually took over the homestead. He married Tryal Morehouse on October 23, 1745.

William Gaylord died October 25, 1743, at the age of 73. His grave, and that of Mrs. Gaylord were the first ones in a cemetery that had been laid out about half a mile south of the Gaylord home.

== Geography ==
Gaylordsville is located at geographical coordinates 41° 38′ 47" North, 73° 29′ 5" West (41.646469, -73.484673).

Gaylordsville is located in the northwest corner of New Milford. It is part of the valley known to the Native Americans as the Wheniuck or Red Plumb Plain. On the east the boundary is Quanuctnic or Long Mountain, but it has never been decided whether it should be at the foot of the mountain or somewhere up on top. The southern boundary is also vague, usually considered to be an imaginary line leaving the Housatonic River somewhere south of the Tory Cave and extending across Squash Hollow. The Sherman town line forms the western boundary, although several homes in Sherman are usually considered to be part of the Gaylordsville community.

The Housatonic River runs through the center of the village and is joined by the Wimisink, Womunshenuck, Naromiyocknowhusunkatankshunk (Morrissey), and Squash Hollow brooks. The south end of the valley is divided into two narrow valleys by Straits Mountain or Pauguiack. The north end of this overlooks the village and is called "the Pinnacle". The area usually considered to be Gaylordsville is about four miles long and one mile wide.

== Historical sites ==
- Brown's Forge, a blacksmith shop. 1870
- The Little Red Schoolhouse 1740 - 1967. The last operating one-room schoolhouse in Connecticut. Also known as the Gaylord School, it was one of New Milford's primary schools for 227 years.
- Merwinsville Hotel 1843

== Education ==
It is in the New Milford School District.

== Notable people ==
- Rex Brasher, American watercolor painter and ornithologist died here in 1960
- Katharine Anthony, biographer
- Elisabeth Irwin, founder of the Little Red School House in New York City
- F. Luis Mora, Uruguayan-born American painter, built and lived in a house on Cedar Hill Road in 1926.
- Isaac Stern, violinist
- Nan Watson, artist
- Florence Maybrick, accused murderer

== Gallery ==
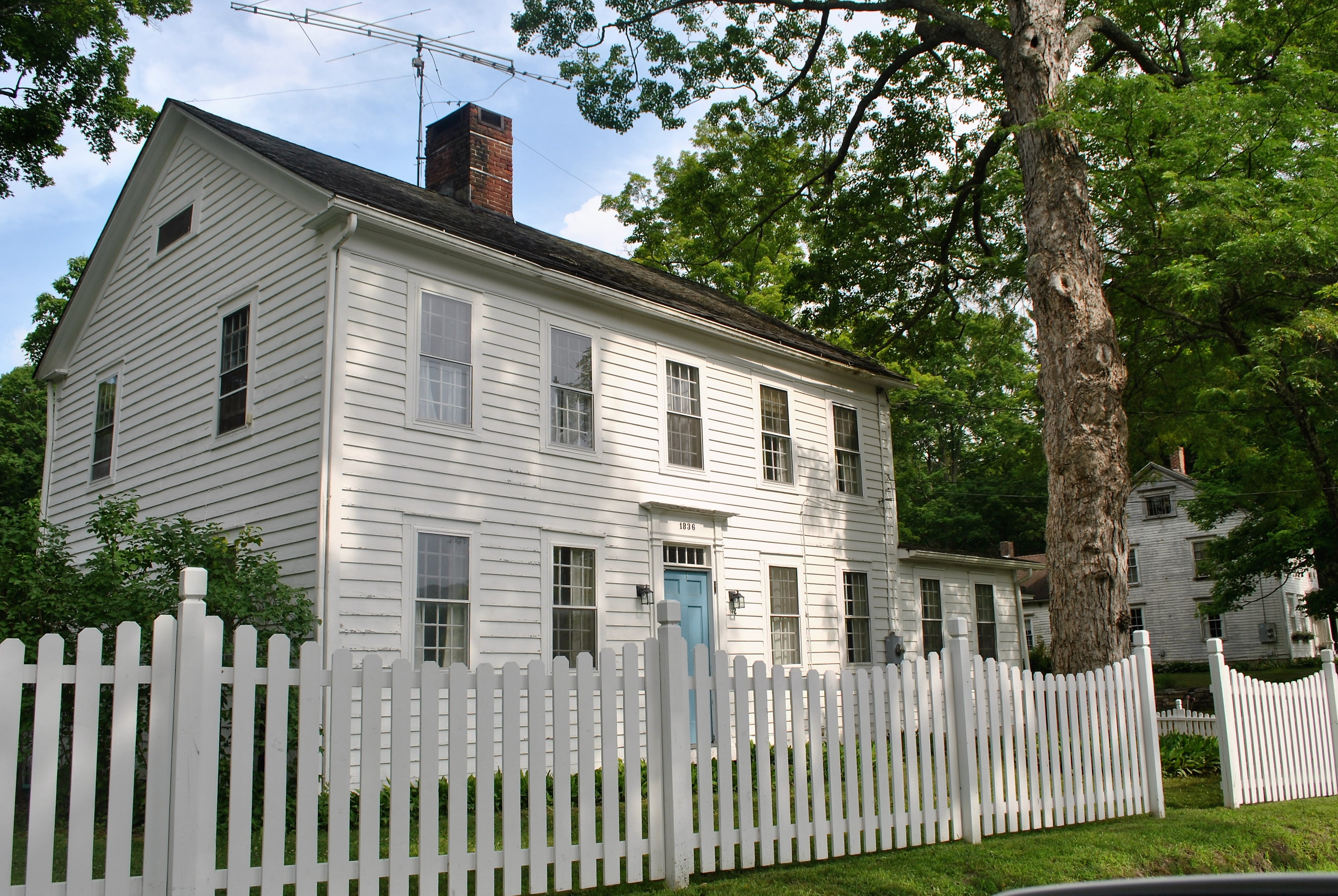

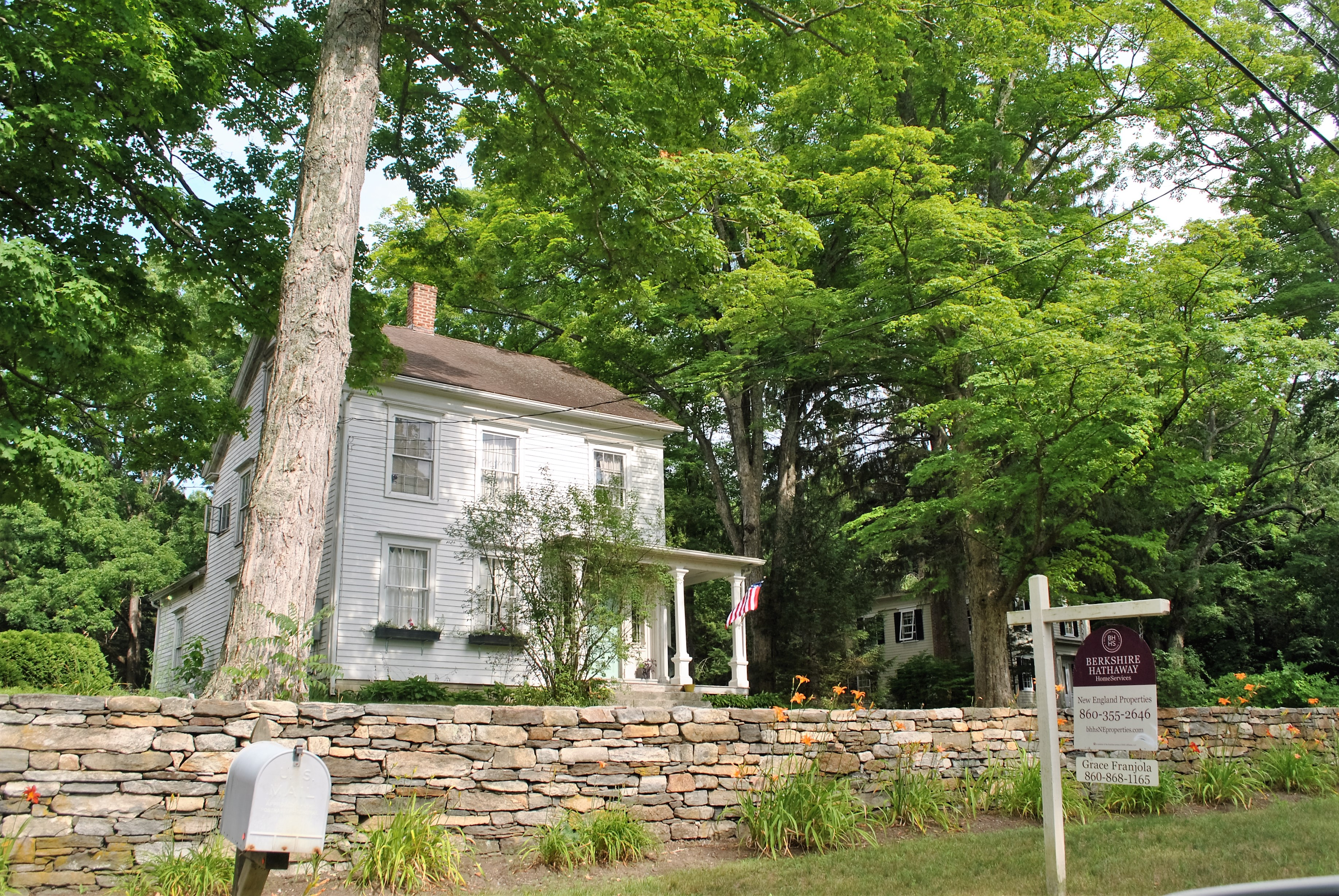

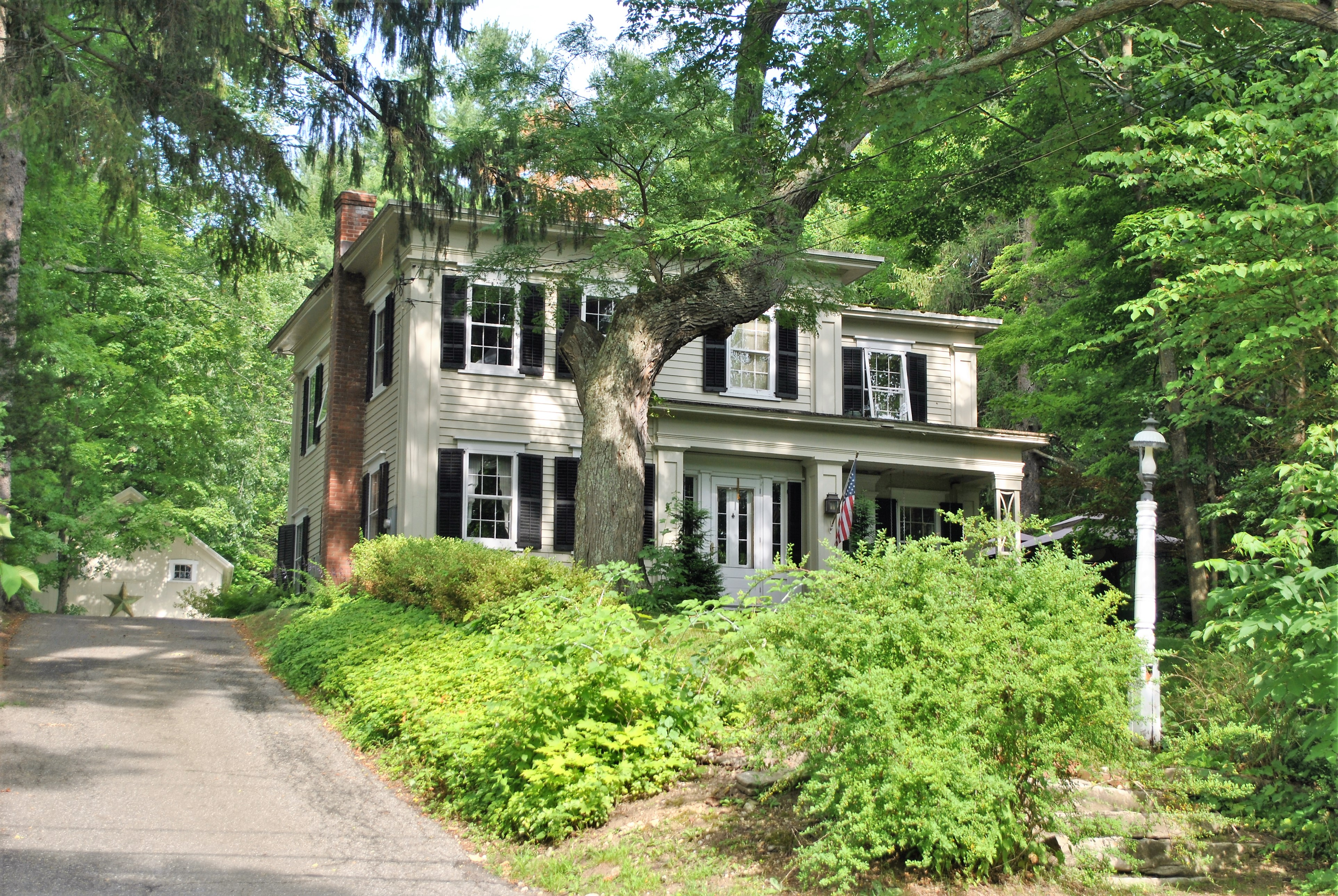

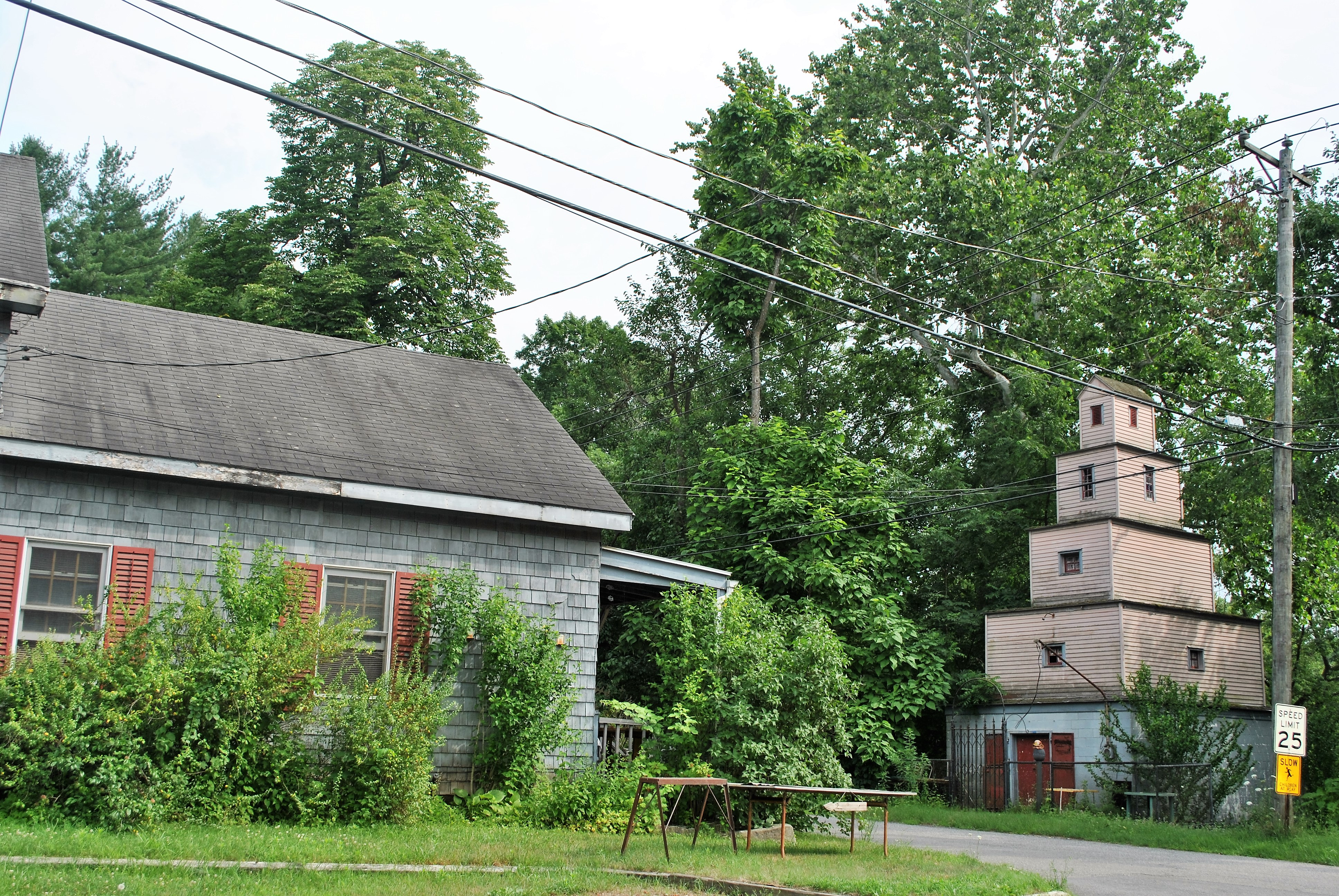
