= Katharine Anthony =

American biographer (1877–1965)

- Born: November 27, 1877; Roseville, Logan County, Arkansas
- Died: November 20, 1965 (aged 87); New York City
- Education: University of Heidelberg; University of Freiburg; University of Chicago
- Partner: Elisabeth Irwin
- Writing career
- Notable work: The Lambs (1945)

Katharine Susan Anthony, sometimes also spelled Katherine (November 27, 1877 – November 20, 1965), was a US biographer best known for The Lambs (1945), a controversial study of the British writers Charles and Mary Lamb.

== Biography ==
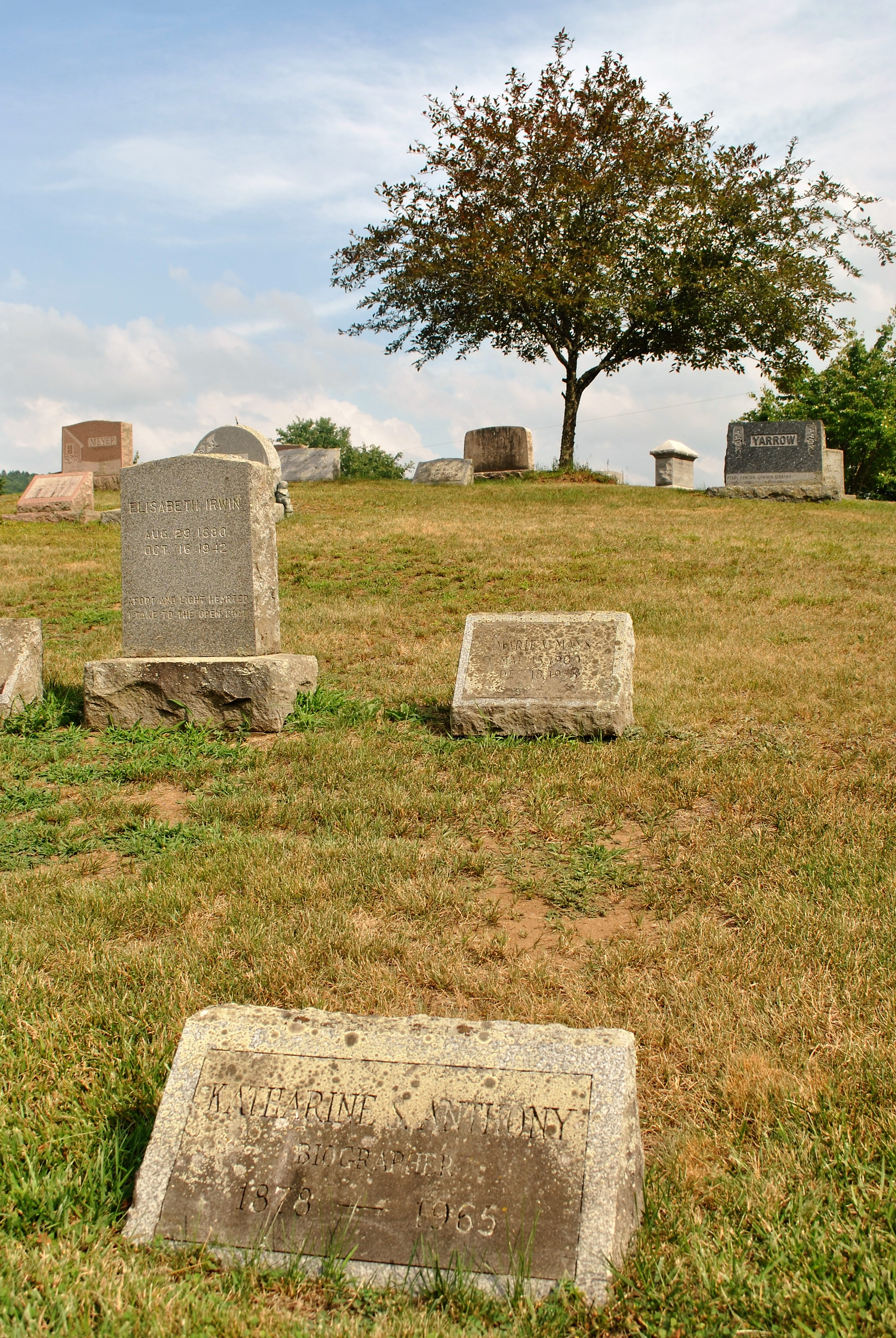
Morningside Cemetery, Gaylordsville, CT

Katharine Anthony was born in Roseville, Logan County, Arkansas, the third daughter of Ernest Augustus Anthony (1846-1904) and Susan Jane Cathey (1845-1917). Her father was a grocer and later a police officer.

She studied at Peabody College for Teachers in Nashville, the universities of Heidelberg and Freiburg, and the University of Chicago. She received a Ph.B degree from Chicago in 1905 and taught at Wellesley College in 1907. She became a public school teacher by 1910 and worked at that time in Fort Smith, Sebastian County, Arkansas. She moved from Arkansas perhaps because her mother had died in 1917, and by 1920 she was living in Manhattan with her life-partner Elisabeth Irwin (1880–1942), the founder of the Little Red School House, with whom she raised several adopted children (source: Odd Girls and Twilight Lovers: A History of Lesbian Life in Twentieth Century America, Lillian Faderman, 1991).

Her book Catherine the Great was positively reviewed in the New York Times (Dec. 20, 1925, pg BR8), which notes that Miss Anthony had, apparently for the first time, access to all of Catherine's private memoirs. Her book Marie Antoinette was called a "...fresh and original life of Marie ..." by the New York Times reviewer (Jan. 29, 1933 pg BR5).

Her books Catherine the Great and Queen Elizabeth each sold more than 100,000 copies.

She died at St. Vincent's Hospital, two weeks after having a heart attack. Her obituary appeared in the New York Times on Nov. 22, 1965 (pg 37). She was survived by a sister, Mrs. Blanche Brown of Berkeley, California. Her funeral was in New York City, and she was buried alongside Miss Irwin, at Gaylordsville, Connecticut, where they had a summer home.

== Works ==
- "Mothers Who Must Earn" 1914 (reprinted in West Side Studies, Ayer Company ISBN 0-405-05434-3)
- "Feminism in Germany and Scandinavia" 1915, Henry Holt
- "Margaret Fuller: A Psychological Biography", Harcourt, Brace and Howe, New York. 1920. OCLC 183791
- "Catherine the Great". New York: Garden City Publishing Company. 1925. (reprint Mar 2003, Kessinger Publishing, 344 pages, ISBN 0-7661-4351-1)
- "Queen Elizabeth" 1929 (reprint Mar 2004, Kessinger Publishing, 316 pages ISBN 0-7661-8640-7)
- "Louisa May Alcott", Alfred A Knopf, 1938 OCLC 944593
- "First Lady of the Revolution: The Life of Mercy Otis Warren." George S MacManus Company (reprint Kennikat Press [1972, c1958], Port Washington, N.Y., 258 pages ISBN 0-8046-1656-6)
- "The Lambs", A.A. Knopf, New York 1945, 264 pages OCLC 1037436
- "Dolly Madison, Her Life and Times" 1949 OCLC 547660
- "Susan B. Anthony: Her Personal History and Her Era" 1954 OCLC 560998
