= Grant Rogers =

American Catskills folk musician and songwriter (1907–1979)

- Rogers on Rainbow Quest (1966)

Background information
- Born: Grant Rogers; 1907; Walton, New York, U.S.
- Died: 1979 (aged 71–72)
- Genres: American folk; old-time music
- Occupations: Musician; songwriter; stonecutter
- Instruments: Guitar; fiddle; vocals
- Years active: c. 1940s–1979

Grant Rogers (1907–1979) was an American folk musician, fiddler, guitarist, and songwriter from the Catskills of New York. He was a self-taught musician who worked as a stonecutter. He composed songs about Catskills life and was documented by folklorists as a traditional "songmaker" of the region. He recorded for Folk-Legacy Records and Folkways Records, appeared at the Newport Folk Festival, and performed on Pete Seeger's television series Rainbow Quest.

== Life ==
Rogers was born in 1907 in Walton, in Delaware County in the western Catskills. He spent part of his youth in Sullivan County before returning to the West Branch of the Delaware River valley, an area later flooded by the Cannonsville Reservoir. He earned his living through manual labor, including construction work and cutting stone in Catskill quarries.

He was self-deprecating about being called a folk singer. Rogers told the Folk-Legacy Records producer Sandy Paton in 1965 that real folk singers were "fellers like Burl Ives or Pete Seeger," while he was just "a stonecutter that makes up songs."

The progressive educator and folklorist Norman Studer, director of Camp Woodland near Phoenicia, brought Rogers to perform at the camp and at its annual Folk Festival of the Catskills, where Rogers met Pete Seeger, Norman Cazden, and Herbert Haufrecht, among others. Rogers died in 1979.

== Music ==
Rogers's recording is Grant Rogers of Walton, New York: Songmaker of the Catskills, released by Folk-Legacy Records in 1965 (reissued on CD in 2002), recorded and annotated by Sandy Paton. The album collects 23 tracks, many of them his own compositions, including "Cannonsville Dam," "Legend of Slide Mountain," and "When a Fellow Is Out of a Job," alongside traditional ballads. He performed on The Cannonsville Story, a Folkways recording tied to a documentary film about the flooding of the Cannonsville valley.

Rogers performed at the Newport Folk Festival in 1966, where he was recorded for the Alan Lomax field archive and where one of his tunes was later included on an old-time music compilation. He appeared on episode 13 of Pete Seeger's Rainbow Quest (1965–66) together with Norman Studer.

== Legacy ==
The folklorist Simon Bronner devotes an extended discussion to Rogers and his music-making in Old-Time Music Makers of New York State (Syracuse University Press, 1987), and the folklorist Norman Studer profiled him in Sing Out!. Rogers's songs and recordings document Catskills folk tradition. Photographs and recordings of him are preserved in the University at Albany's Norman Studer Papers.
