= Rainbow Quest =

American folk music television series (1965–66)

- Title card
- Genre: Folk music
- Presented by: Pete Seeger
- Country of origin: United States
- Original language: English
- No. of episodes: 39

Production
- Running time: approx. 60 minutes
- Production company: Advertisers' Broadcasting Company

Original release
- Network: WNJU-TV
- Release: November 13, 1965 – 1966

Rainbow Quest is an American television series devoted to folk music and hosted by Pete Seeger from 1965 to 1966. It was videotaped in black-and-white and featured musicians from traditional American music genres such as traditional folk music, old-time music, bluegrass and blues. Each episode opened with Seeger singing his song "Oh, Had I a Golden Thread", and the series took its title from his 1960 Folkways album The Rainbow Quest.

The series grew out of Seeger's long exclusion from commercial television. Seeger was the show's main investor, and the veteran broadcaster Sholom Rubinstein was its credited producer and director. Thirty-nine episodes were taped, each running about an hour. Seeger used the program to present traditional musicians he had met over decades in the music world.

Seeger often paired older traditional performers with younger folk-revival singers, and guests ranged from blues and old-time artists to crossover stars such as Judy Collins and Donovan. Critics welcomed the show's informality. Rainbow Quest has never been reissued in full, though Shanachie Records later released twelve episodes on DVD and others have circulated through libraries and the Internet Archive.

== Background ==
Seeger had been kept off commercial American television for more than a decade before Rainbow Quest. In 1955 he was subpoenaed to appear before the House Un-American Activities Committee (HUAC). He refused to answer questions about his political beliefs and associations, telling the committee they were "very improper questions for any American to be asked", and unlike most witnesses he declined to invoke the Fifth Amendment. He was convicted of contempt of Congress, though an appeals court later overturned the conviction. He had also been placed on an industry-wide blacklist that limited his access to the mass media. The blacklist was still in force in 1963, when the producers of the ABC folk-music series Hootenanny declined to book him because of his HUAC appearance.

An opening came through UHF television. American set manufacturers were not required to include UHF tuners until 1964. As a result, UHF stations reached few viewers and drew little advertising. They filled their schedules with inexpensive programming aimed at niche audiences. One such station was WNJU-TV (Channel 47) in Newark, New Jersey, a largely Spanish-language outlet that had gone on the air only in May 1965. According to Joe LoRe, a cameraman on the show, it was the station's general manager, Ed Cooperstein, who sought Seeger out to create a program.

Early broadcasts were titled The Pete Seeger Show. Seeger was the series' main investor and was credited as its producer and host. Sholom Rubinstein, a New York producer from a Yiddish radio background, co-produced the program through his firm, Advertisers' Broadcasting Company. The first episode aired on November 13, 1965.

== Production ==
The program was produced on a low budget, with Seeger as its main investor and his co-producer Sholom Rubinstein. The closing credits read "Produced and Directed by Sholom Rubinstein." Rubinstein was a veteran broadcaster with roughly three decades in radio and television, and his company, Advertisers' Broadcasting, produced the series.

Seeger's wife, Toshi Seeger, was credited as "Chief Cook and Bottle Washer." Simon Buck reads the credit as an ironic understatement, describing her as "an essential mover behind the camera." She had also been the cinematographer on the ethnographic films the couple shot during their travels.

The shows were unrehearsed and informal, with Seeger and his guests trading songs and joining in unplanned jams.

Seeger devoted one episode to Woody Guthrie, by then incapacitated by Huntington's disease, and another to Lead Belly, who had died in 1949. For the Lead Belly program he screened film of the singer in performance. Other episodes drew on home movies and ethnographic films the Seegers had shot during their travels. On the program that opened the 1967 public-television run, for example, Seeger showed footage of his brother Mike Seeger playing banjo on a unicycle and of a Japanese folk group.

Altogether 39 shows, each running about an hour, were recorded in 1965–66 at WNJU-TV (Channel 47), a UHF station with studios in Newark, New Jersey, serving the New York City area.

The shows were broadcast by Channel 47, primarily a Spanish-language outlet, to a very limited audience because only televisions equipped with a UHF antenna and tuner could receive them, and reception was difficult in an age prior to cable. For a few years in 1967–68, the shows were repeated on public television station WNDT (Channel 13, now WNET), which gave the series its New York public-television premiere on October 2, 1967. The series was also carried by public-television stations in other cities, beginning in San Francisco in July 1967, followed by WXXI in Rochester that December and WTVS in Detroit in January 1968. Seeger said that only twelve or thirteen of the twenty stations needed to recommission the series had carried the reruns.

The Clancy Brothers and Tommy Makem and Tom Paxton appeared on the first show of the series on short notice because Seeger felt ill, as he explained on camera. Of the Clancy Brothers, only Paddy and Liam appeared, along with Makem. No explanation was given for Tom Clancy's absence from the group. A clip of Tommy Makem singing "The Butcher Boy" during this initial episode appeared in Martin Scorsese's Grammy-winning documentary about Bob Dylan, No Direction Home, which focused on his earliest musical influences.

== Content and themes ==
Seeger's guests spanned different styles and backgrounds including blues, gospel, old-time "roots" musicians, international "world" folk performers and crossover folk-pop stars such as Judy Collins and Donovan.

Many of his guests were older traditional musicians he had encountered over three decades of musical and political activity. Though known to folk-revival devotees, some were largely unknown to mainstream television audiences. The program thus preserved filmed performances of aging musicians. The episode with Mississippi John Hurt, for example, is the last known footage of him before his 1966 death.

The historian Simon Buck argues that the program reflects "a strident, if underrecognized, zeal for intergenerationalism" on Seeger's part. He notes that over half of the episodes feature at least one guest in their late fifties or older. This older guest was typically paired with a younger performer.

Examples of such pairings on the show included:

- Georgia Sea Islands singer Bessie Jones with children from the Downtown Community School (episode 7).
- The blind gospel guitarist Reverend Gary Davis with the young folk-pop singers Donovan and Shawn Phillips (episode 23).
- Mississippi John Hurt and the aging banjoist Paul Cadwell alongside the younger Hedy West (episode 36).

This pattern, Buck argues, reads as a deliberate counter to the era's image of generational division. He writes that with its social rather than purely commercial purpose, the show deserves recognition as a pioneer of educational television and a precursor of later intergenerational programs such as Mister Rogers' Neighborhood and Sesame Street.

== Reception ==
When Rainbow Quest debuted, critics contrasted it with the commercial music programming of the time. Critic Jack Gould reviewed the debut for The New York Times and welcomed Seeger's "long overdue" arrival on television and judged the program "blissfully free of the slightest trace of show business ostentation". He said "Channel 47 alone has the honest article."

In January 1966, The Philadelphia Inquirer called Rainbow Quest an "ultra-informal, shirt-sleeves" show that folk "buffs" would make a weekly "must". It pointed out that host Pete Seeger had been turned away from the popular TV show Hootenanny.

== Preservation and home media ==
Rainbow Quest has never been reissued in its entirety. VHS and later DVD compilations of individual episodes circulated mainly through libraries and archives, and episodes have appeared sporadically on the Internet Archive and YouTube.

Shanachie Records released 12 of the episodes on six DVDs, paired two to a disc:

- Johnny Cash and June Carter / Roscoe Holcomb with Jean Redpath
- The Clancy Brothers and Tommy Makem / The Mamou String Band
- The Stanley Brothers with Cousin Emmy / Doc Watson with Clint Howard and Fred Price
- The New Lost City Ramblers / The Greenbriar Boys
- Judy Collins / Elizabeth Cotten
- Sonny Terry and Brownie McGhee / Mississippi John Hurt

In September 2015 the archivist and librarian Karl-Rainer Blumenthal uploaded ten episodes to the Internet Archive. His accompanying blog post originally stated that the show had "been in the public domain since the 1990s", a claim he later qualified, noting that he "cannot confidently characterize the copyright status of this work".

== Episode list ==
1. The Clancy Brothers and Tommy Makem with Tom Paxton
2. "Lead Belly" (solo performance by Seeger)
3. Elizabeth Cotten with Rosa Valentin & Rafael Martinez
4. Ruth Rubin
5. Jean Ritchie and Bernice Reagon
6. Malvina Reynolds and Jack Elliott
7. Bessie Jones and Children from the Downtown Community School
8. New Lost City Ramblers
9. The Beers Family
10. Herbert Manana
11. Martha Schlamme & Abraham Stockman
12. Doc Watson with Clint Howard and Fred Price
13. Norman Studer and Grant Rogers
14. "Political songs" (solo performance by Seeger)
15. Lino Manocchia, Ralph Marino, and Federico Picciano
16. Mimi and Richard Fariña
17. Roscoe Holcomb with Jean Redpath
18. The Stanley Brothers and the Clinch Mountain Boys with Cousin Emmy
19. Sonia Malkine
20. "Woody Guthrie" (solo performance by Seeger)
21. Patrick Sky and The Pennywhistlers
22. Len Chandler
23. Donovan, Shawn Phillips, and Reverend Gary Davis
24. Alexander Zelkin
25. Mamou Cajun Band
26. Frank Warner and film of Frank Proffitt
27. Paul Draper & Coleridge Perkinson
28. Penny Cohen and Sonya Cohen
29. Theodore Bikel and Rashid Hussein
30. Steve Addiss and Bill Crofut with Pham Duy
31. The Greenbriar Boys
32. Judy Collins
33. Jim Garland and Hazel Garland
34. Sonny Terry and Brownie McGhee
35. The Children of the Downtown Community School (return appearance, previously seen in episode 7)
36. Mississippi John Hurt, Hedy West & Paul Cadwell
37. Herbert Levy, K. L. Wong and Hi-Landers Steel Band
38. Buffy Sainte-Marie
39. Johnny Cash and June Carter

== See also ==
- "Where Have All the Flowers Gone?"
