= Camp Woodland =

Summer camp and cultural center in New York (1939–1962)

- Formation: 1939
- Dissolved: 1962
- Type: Summer camp
- Headquarters: Woodland Valley, near Phoenicia
- Location: Shandaken, Ulster County, New York, U.S.
- Director: Norman Studer

Camp Woodland was a progressive, racially and economically integrated children's summer camp that operated from 1939 to 1962 in Woodland Valley near Phoenicia, in the Catskill Mountains of Ulster County, New York. Directed throughout its existence by the educator and folklorist Norman Studer, the camp built its program around the folklore and traditional music of the Catskills. Through its folklore-collecting expeditions and its annual Folk Festival of the Catskills, it became a cultural center in the Hudson Valley and is associated with the mid-20th-century American folk music revival.

== Background and founding ==
Camp Woodland was founded in 1939 by a group of educators influenced by progressive education and the social ideas of the New Deal. It grew out of the earlier Camp Hilltop. It was established by Norman Studer together with Rose Sydney, Regine Dicker (Ferber), Sara Abelson (Abramson), and his wife Hannah Studer.

Its director, Norman Studer (1902–1978), was a former student of John Dewey's ideas who taught at progressive schools in New York City and later directed the Downtown Community School. Studer ran the camp as a setting for experiential, democratic education. The camp admitted children across racial and economic lines at a time when such integration was uncommon.

== Folklore and music program ==
Camp Woodland had a program of collecting and performing the folklore and folk music of the surrounding Catskills. Each summer Studer took groups of campers to visit elderly residents of remote mountain communities to record their songs, stories, and crafts. The residents were then invited to the camp to perform and teach. Much of this work documented a specific regional culture that was being displaced, including communities in the valley flooded by the Pepacton Reservoir.

The camp's music directors were the composer and musicologist Norman Cazden and the composer Herbert Haufrecht. They notated melodies from local singers while campers transcribed the words. Among the musical traditions the camp documented were from the singer George Edwards, whose repertory later formed the core of a published collection. Another documented work was from singer and fiddler Grant Rogers.

Each season culminated in the public "Folk Festival of the Catskills". This combined a newly written cantata on local history performed by campers, performances by area musicians, and camper presentations drawn from their folklore collecting. The folk singer Pete Seeger was a recurring teacher and performer at the camp and its festivals. The Studer Papers include a 1955 recording of Seeger performing "Old Joe Clark" at the camp.

The festival and camp also hosted other notable musicians, among them the Georgia Sea Islands singer Bessie Jones and the Nigerian drummer Babatunde Olatunji, both of whom Studer recorded there. The folklorist Joe Hickerson, later head of the Archive of Folk Song at the Library of Congress and a co-author of Pete Seeger's "Where Have All the Flowers Gone?", was a counselor and the camp's folk-music director in 1959–1960.

The collecting carried out at the camp over more than two decades was eventually published as the scholarly volume Folk Songs of the Catskills (Cazden, Haufrecht and Studer, State University of New York Press, 1982), which a reviewer in the Journal of Musicological Research called a model for regional folk-song collections. The camp's recordings, films, and photographs are preserved in the Norman Studer Papers at the University at Albany, SUNY.

== People associated with Camp Woodland ==
Figures associated with American music and culture attended or worked at Camp Woodland. The Greenwich Village session guitarist Bruce Langhorne was a counselor there, as was the singer Bill McAdoo.

Campers included the science-fiction writer Samuel R. Delany, who attended in the early 1950s, the historian Ronald Radosh, and the Vermont political activist Peter Diamondstone.

The folk musicians John Herald, Janis Ian, and Eric Weissberg were campers who went on to recording careers.

== Political context ==
Camp Woodland's progressive ethos and associations with the political left drew criticism during the McCarthy era, when detractors nicknamed it "Camp Red." In 1955 Studer was called to testify before a New York State legislative committee investigating Communist associations connected with the camp. According to a memoir by the former camper Emily Paradise Achtenberg published in Monthly Review, the body was a state committee that questioned Studer about Communist Party membership.

No charges resulted and the camp continued to operate until 1962.

== Closure and legacy ==
Camp Woodland closed in 1962 after more than twenty seasons. A fire destroyed the camp buildings in 1963.

The Norman Studer Papers at the University at Albany hold the camp's audio recordings, films, and photographs. Folk Songs of the Catskills remains a published record. The camp has been the subject of a book-length history, The Improbable Community: Camp Woodland and the American Democratic Ideal (2016) by the former camper Bill Horne and of the documentary film The People's Camp.

Historians and journalists have described the camp as an early example of community-based public history and as one of the settings of folk-music culture later associated with the nearby town of Woodstock.
