= Bill Crofut =

- Born: William Crofut III; December 14, 1935; Cleveland, Ohio, U.S.
- Died: January 25, 1999 (aged 63) Sandisfield, Massachusetts, U.S.
- Occupations: Musician; singer
- Instruments: Vocals; banjo
- Years active: 1962–1999

William Crofut III (December 14, 1935 – January 25, 1999) was an American folksinger. During his career he recorded more than 20 albums and CDs in genres ranging from folk, children's songs, jazz, to classical. He also gave concerts in more than fifty countries, and appeared at the White House and Carnegie Hall. His musical influences included Pete Seeger, clarinetist Tony Scott, and pianist Peter Lang. Crofut also experimented with different performance styles and instrumentations, such as performing classical music on the banjo.

== Life and career ==
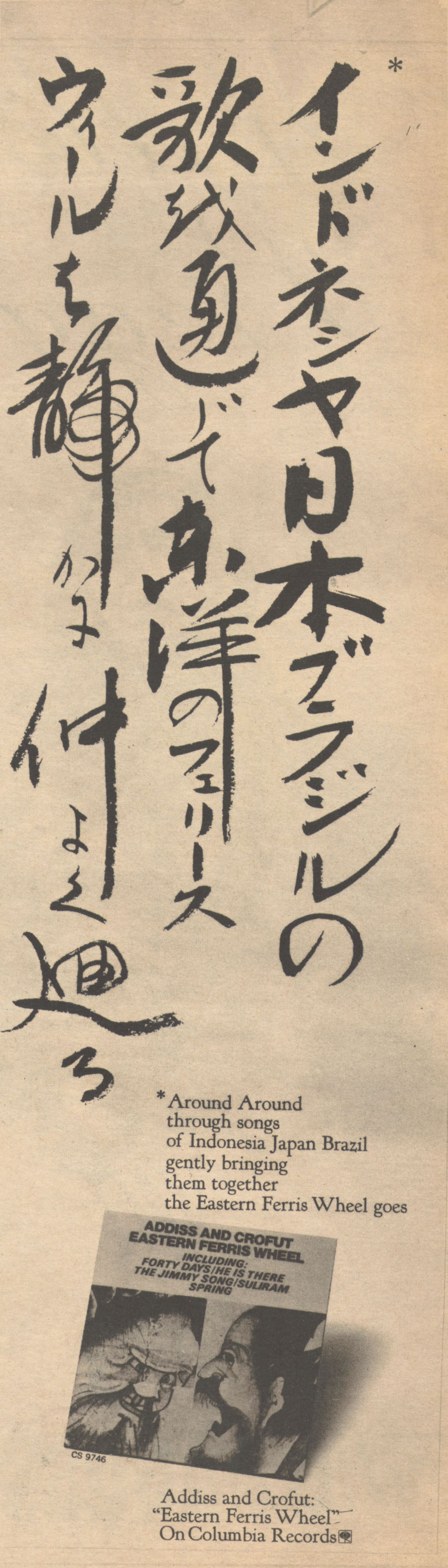
Ad for Addiss and Crofut album Eastern Ferris Wheel, 1968.

Crofut was born in Cleveland, Ohio, attended the Putney High School and majored in music and literature at Allegheny College, where he took lessons on the French horn. He graduated in 1958 and then was drafted into the U.S. Army, being discharged in 1960.

In the 1960s he toured with singer, guitarist, and long-time friend Stephen Addiss (1935 - May 11, 2022) as part of the U.S. State Department's cultural exchange program; they would later collaborate on several albums. In April 1963 Crofut and Addiss met with President Johnson and Secretary of Defense Robert MacNamara at the White House, where they were awarded a citation for their work in the cultural exchange program. The pair also met with United Nations Ambassador Adlai Stevenson the same year when they performed at a party Stevenson gave for U.N. delegates. Addiss and Crofut toured with Stan Getz in 1963.

In the 1970s Crofut performed with baritone Benjamin Luxon and harpsichordist Kenneth Cooper; he also taught a vocal master class during summers at the Tanglewood Music Center, and taught intermittently in the world music program at Wesleyan University in the 1980s. In addition, Crofut made several recordings with Chris Brubeck and classical guitarist Joel Brown. He appeared on the Today show, the Tonight Show with Johnny Carson, and the NPR show A Prairie Home Companion. He also appeared on the TV series Rainbow Quest with Steve Addiss and Vietnamese songwriter Pham Duy. For a time in the mid 70s he was joined on tour at venues such as Town Hall and Alice Tully Hall and recorded with guitarist Kevin Weyl.

He and his second wife Susan established the Simple Gifts for Children Fund in 1998 to benefit children in western Massachusetts.

Among the instruments Crofut owned was a harpsichord he built from a kit by Hubbard Harpsichords, and a pipe organ he built himself. He also built a banjo from plans and designs by the Merlin Manufacturing Company.

His last recording (Dance on a Moonbeam) is a compilation of children's songs with Frederica von Stade, Dawn Upshaw, Chris Brubeck, and the London Symphony Orchestra. The songs are interspersed with passages from Shakespeare read by Meryl Streep.

Crofut described the first time he heard Pete Seeger at a concert at Oberlin College in the 1950s:

He spoke for those who could not speak for themselves ... His was the voice of the underdog, the conscience of youth, the power of conviction. And his was the voice that made me go out and buy a banjo and a Seeger instruction record. I practiced eight hours a day and it wasn't long before I was good enough to accompany songs that lashed out at the things that bothered me. Naturally these efforts took their toll on my grades.

... Pete was building a barn then, and in return for my help with the construction he gave me banjo lessons. Without the Seegers I probably never would have made the grade as a performer.

Senator Robert F. Kennedy, in his foreword to Crofut's book Troubadour: A Different Battlefield, stated:

Mr. Crofut and his companion, Mr. Addiss, have rightly been called the "troubadours of goodwill." This is the story of African schoolchildren who came for miles to share a performance with them at the top of a hill in Kenya; of the playing to a chorus of artillery fire before Vietnamese villagers; singing to wounded students in Korea; reaching remote villages by bamboo rafts in northern Thailand; and teaching finger game songs to children in Nepal ... They disregarded physical hardships in order to sing in village markets, homes and schools, in many cases to audiences which had never seen an American.

Crofut died of cancer in Sandisfield, Massachusetts at the age of 64.

== Discography ==
- World Tour with Folk Songs (1962)
- Such Interesting People (1963)
- 400 Years of Folk Music (1964)
- Music of Viet Nam (1965)
- Addiss and Crofut (1966)
- Eastern Ferris Wheel (1968)
- Summit Sessions (1971)
- Poetry in Song (1973)
- Folk and Baroque (1975)
- Simple Gifts: British & American Folk Songs (1980)
- The Goshen Concert (1981)
- Simple Gifts (1983)
- All Through the Night (1984)
- An Evening with Bill Crofut (1984)
- Dance to Your Daddy (1984)
- On Christmas Eve (1985)
- Two Gentlemen Folk (1987)
- Lullabies and Dances (1990)
- Child's Song (1991)
- Unsquare Dance (1991)
- Red, White & Blues Live in Concert (1992)
- Across Your Dreams (1995)
- Folk Music of Bartok & Kodaly (1995)
- Bach to Brubeck (2000)
- Dance on a Moonbeam (2000)

== Books ==
- Troubadour: A Different Battlefield. E.P. Dutton, 1968. Foreword by Robert F. Kennedy.
- The Moon on the One Hand. Atheneum, 1975.
- A Look at a Lifetime: Bill Crofut Remembers. Avonelle Associates, 1980.
