= Elisabeth Irwin =

American academic (1880–1942)

Elisabeth Antoinette Irwin (29 August 1880 –16 October 1942) was the founder of the Little Red School House. She was an educator, psychologist, reformer, and declared lesbian, living with her life partner Katharine Anthony and the two children they adopted.

== Life and career ==
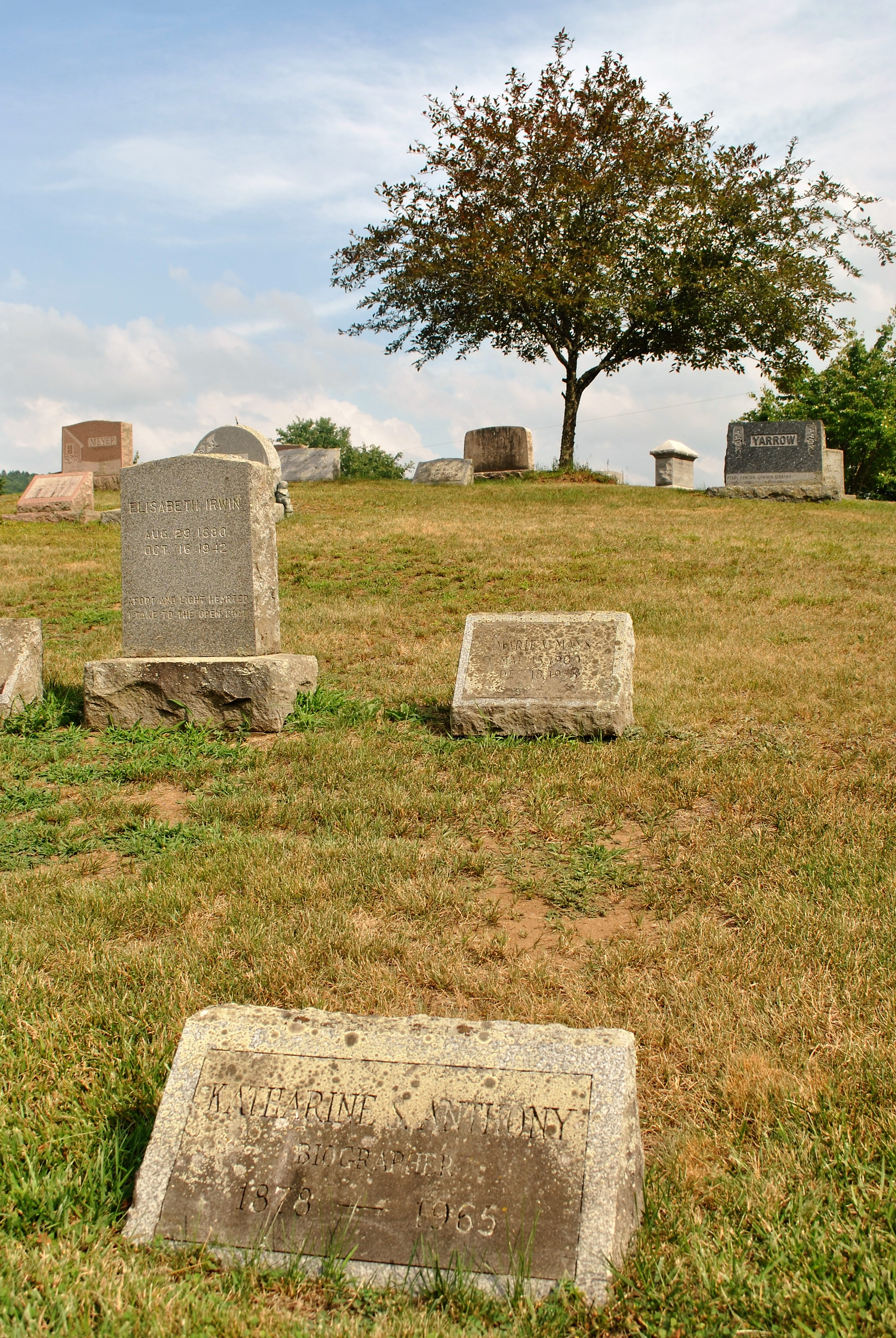
Morningside Cemetery, Gaylordsville, Connecticut

Irwin was born in Brooklyn, to William Henry Irwin and Josephina Augusta Easton. Her father was a cotton merchant. She attended the Packer Collegiate Institute and received her A.B. from Smith College in 1903 and her M.A. from Columbia University in 1923. She was a member of the feminist intellectual club Heterodoxy.

In 1912, while a member of the staff of the Public Education Association, she began work at revising the curriculum for the children at Public School 64. She founded the Little Red School House curriculum in Manhattan in 1921, in the red-painted annex of Public School 61. Her work there, and then at Public School 41, is described in an article for The New York Times as an experiment to demonstrate that the broader, more active "methods of the so-called progressive schools... would be practicable under public school conditions."

Faced with funding cuts, it appeared that the experiment would end, but a group of parents came together in an ice-cream parlor, urging her to start her own school and promising financial support. In September 1932, the "Little Red School House" got its own building at Bleecker Street. At first, only primary education was available, but in 1940 a high school was added.

She died in the New York Hospital in October 1942. She was survived by her partner, Katharine Anthony, and their two adopted daughters, Mrs. Howard Gresens of Plandome, New York and Mrs. R.O. Bogue of Pensacola, Florida. Her funeral was conducted in Gaylordsville, Connecticut, where she and Miss Anthony maintained a summer home, having called themselves the "gay ladies of Gaylordsville". She was buried there alongside Miss Anthony.
