= Nan Watson =

American painter (1876–1966)

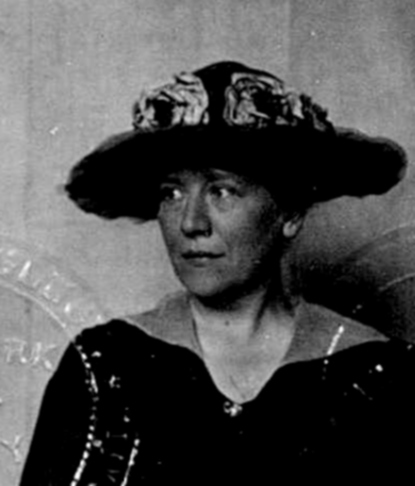
- Nan Watson in 1917 (passport photo)
- Born: Agnes Christian Paterson; September 13, 1876; Edinburgh, Scotland
- Died: September 15, 1966 (aged 90); Washington, D.C.

Nan Watson (1876–1966) was an American artist known for the flower paintings, portraits, and still lifes she made during the 1920s and 1930s. Showing frequently in group and solo exhibitions, she received praise for both the aesthetic and technical qualities of her work. Critics described her paintings as sincere, forthright, and direct and said they demonstrated good draftsmanship, harmonious composition, and fresh color values. In 1929, the art historian Lloyd Goodrich said, "One knows no other painter of flowers who captures so completely their delicate life without becoming in the least sentimental about it or lapsing into merely technical fireworks." In 1932, Edward Alden Jewell, the principal critic for the New York Times published a lengthy critique of one of her shows. In it, he wrote, "The field is thronged with artists who paint flowers; many of these artists are highly successful, though few are seen to arrive at the goal of superlative distinction. Among those who do attain this coveted goal, Nan Watson must certainly be numbered." At the same time, Margaret Breuning of the Evening Post wrote concerning the flower paintings, "It is the ability of the artist to give lyric transcription of natural forms in terms of design which imbues these canvases with their significance." Concerning Watson's portraits, Breuning noted a "surety of draftsmanship" and Watson's "fine perception that pierces to the essentials". Similarly, an unsigned review of 1928 said Watson succeeded in producing a "candor, directness, [and] fidelity to personal conceptions that one finds delightful in a world where there much conformity to standards of aesthetic performance from which the timid or the conventional may not deviate." This critic concluded, "Not only sensitive perception and technical skill are to be enjoyed in this engaging exhibition, but the revelation of personality that has gone into the making of each canvas."

== Early life and training ==
Watson's Scottish family emigrated to the United States in 1878. She was raised in Buffalo, New York and attended a small, private girls' school called the Buffalo Seminary. When she was 18 in 1895, she and her aunt Grace Paterson traveled to Scotland and lived for nearly three years with their family in Edinburgh. During that time, Watson traveled to Paris to study art at the Académie Colarossi, a school that had two advantages from her point of view: it admitted female students and it allowed these students to work from live male models. After she returned to Buffalo in 1898, Watson studied at the art school of the Buffalo Art Students' League. (Note: The Art Students' Club joined with the Buffalo Fine Arts Academy to found the school of the Art Students' League in 1892. George Bridgman was director and instructor.) In the fall of 1906, Watson moved to Manhattan to study at the Art Students League of New York and while there took instruction from the well-known portraitist, William Merritt Chase.

== Career in art ==
(1) Nan Watson, "Portrait", about 1916, oil on canvas, 18 1/8 × 14 1/8 inches

(2) Nan Watson, "Beatrice Reading", about 1931, oil on canvas, 24 x 20 1/5 inches

(3) Nan Watson, Untitled (Gladiolus), about 1917, watercolor and pencil on paper, 12 3/8 x 7 1/2 inches

(4) Nan Watson, "Lilies", about 1924, oil on linen, 18 x 12 inches

(5) Nan Watson, "Modern Puritan", about 1939 oil on canvas, 18 1/2 x 24 1/2 inches

(6) Nan Watson, "Tulips", about 1932, oil on canvas, 18 × 18 inches

(7) Nan Watson, "Fruit in Blue Jar", about 1933, oil on canvas, 18 3/16 × 18 1/8 inches

(8) Nan Watson, "Plums", about 1939 oil on canvas, 10 x 12 inches

A flower picture should express the painter's sense of the momentous power of natural growth—the power that is manifested when a seedling breaks through a solid asphalt pavement—and it should also be an orchestration of color and form, complete and entirely without accidental touches.

— Nan Watson, Quoted from an interview conducted by Fred S. Bartlett in 1939.

Between the fall of 1900 and the spring of 1906, she was the sole instructor in the art department of the University of South Dakota. During the two years before she took this job and during vacations during the following two, she continued to participate in regular exhibitions of the society. Reviewing one of these shows in 1900, a critic noted that Watson was "a young artist who shows considerable feeling and sentiment in her work". During these years, Watson maintained a studio in Buffalo in which she painted and held classes in drawing and painting. In 1901, a reporter noted that she had received "many orders for portraits".

After moving to Manhattan in 1906, Watson continued to reside and work in the city for the next 27 years. She moved to Washington, D.C. in 1933 when her husband, art critic Forbes Watson, was appointed technical director a fine arts advisory committee of the Treasury Department. In 1934, she took a job as a clerk in that agency's Section of Painting and Sculpture while her husband was then technical director of the agency's Public Works of Art Project. At the end of World War II, the couple moved from Washington to Gaylordsville, Connecticut and after her husband's death in 1960 Watson returned to Washington where she lived out the few years left in her life.

=== Solo, duo, and three-artist exhibitions, 1916–1937 ===
In what seems to have been her first major appearance in a Manhattan gallery, Watson contributed portraits to an exhibition at the National Academy of Design in 1916. A critic for the New York Tribune complained that in general the portraits in this show made a "poor showing" but said the portraits of Watson and a few others were "admirable", "sincere", and "full of character". An article in the Sunday magazine section of the New York Times said one of her portraits (that of the artist Paul Burlin) was "a fine piece of work", both "fresh in color and remarkably certain in tone values". The author added that it was "not merely good painting, but good portraiture, which means that it gives us the artist's idea of the sitter and immediately interests us in that idea." Early in December, she was given a solo exhibition at Knoedler's, including sixteen portraits and flower paintings. A critic for the New York Times said they showed an "artistic character without mannerism" and credited Watson with an "unpretending talent that occasionally rises to a high level of artistic accomplishment".

In 1919, Watson showed flower paintings at the Whitney Studio Gallery along with two other artists, Mahonri Young and Herman M. Linding. A critic for American Art News commended "a strongly painted colorful collection of her always attractive flower pieces" in this show and, in the Brooklyn Daily Eagle, Hamilton Easter Field praised her artistry and her avoidance of the tricks commonly used to distract from poor workmanship.

In 1923, the Wildenstein Galleries in New York gave Watson a solo exhibition of flower paintings and portraits. A critic for Art News called it a "brilliant show" having paintings "brilliant in color" that were "brilliantly done" and a critic for the Morning Telegraph wrote of the "beautiful color and arrangement" of her work as well as its "form and balance". The Times critic said the show was so "gay and jolly it is refreshing and a pleasure to see it" but regretted that the portraits lacked the spontaneity of the flower paintings. Writing in the Evening Post, Margaret Breuning said the flower studies revealed a "skillful combination of delicate precision in rendering the texture and contours of flowers with a broad harmony of composition that makes a singularly glowing painting in which each detail contributes its special accent."

When, in 1928, the Rehn Galleries gave Watson a solo show of flower paintings and a few portraits, New York critics noticed the event. A critic for the New York Sun said Watson was "a flower painter of repute" who also made attractive portraits having excellent likenesses. The New York Times said she had a sensitive eye for color [and] a notable feeling for arrangement". A critic for Art News said the portraits were "admirably unmannered". The Evening Post reproduced a portrait of Dorothy Varian and described the painting in detail. The author noted the "delicacy and power combined" in the painting as well as its "candor, directness, [and] fidelity to personal conceptions". Helen Appleton Read, writing in the Brooklyn Daily Eagle, said of the flower paintings "they are not decorations, follow no formula of design or color, but exist for themselves as works of art." She added: "The directness of the statement is disarming. In presenting no definite manner or striking arrangement, they are apparently charming expert bits of realism, lovely because the model was so in life."

In 1929, the Whitney Studio Galleries gave Watson a duo exhibition with the landscape painter, Arthur E. Cederquist. Writing in the New York Times, Lloyd Goodrich called her a "portraitist of flowers", whose paintings were "alive with the freshness and the fragile brilliancy of their subjects." He concluded: "One knows no other painter of flowers who captures so completely their delicate life without becoming in the least sentimental about it or lapsing into merely technical fireworks." In the Brooklyn Daily Eagle, Helen Appleton Read's critique credited Watson with "an increased mastery of form" and said she maintained "a sincere and personal appreciation of the subject and a simple, direct method of presenting it." The article was accompanied by a reproduction of a portrait of the head and shoulders of a woman entitled, simply, "Portrait". Read said the work combined "the power-like grace characteristic of the flower compositions with sensitive appreciation of character." This portrait is shown above, image no. 1.

In 1932, when Watson showed recent oil paintings in a solo exhibition at the Kraushaar Galleries on Fifth Avenue in Manhattan, critics, again, took notice. One said she showed "work of the highest quality ... honest, unpretentious, and beautifully 'felt'". Another saw "surety of draftsmanship", "fine perception that pierces to the essentials", and "well-related color". A third said "her ability to invest her subjects with charm and grace adds to their integrity as works of art and makes increasingly preposterous the contention held by many of the so-called moderns that to be humanly charming is to lose aesthetic integrity." Edward Alden Jewell, the principal critic for the New York Times commented on Watson's "quiet passion of understanding that gets to the heart of essences". He also called attention to portraits that were, to him, " quite as subtle and gracefully wrought" as the flower paintings. One of these, "Beatrice Reading", is shown above, image no. 2.

In 1937, she presented a solo exhibition at the Kraushaar Galleries. Reviewing the show, Howard Devree of the New York Times reported that the watercolors she showed revealed "her direct feeling for the medium and an unfailing decorative taste." A reviewer for Art News said the paintings were "unpretentious watercolors, fragile in feeling and delicate in color." Watson was not given a retrospective exhibition during her life or after death but the Whitney Museum of American Art included its holdings of her paintings in its 2011 show called "Breaking Ground: The Whitney’s Founding Collection". (Note: Watson's paintings in this exhibition were "Bouquet, Summer" (1937), "Zinneas" (1937), "Anemones" (undated), "Flowers and Fruit (undated), "Fruit in Blue Jar" (undated), "Lilies" (undated), and "Portrait" (undated).)

=== Group exhibitions, 1996–1946 ===
Before her extended stay in Scotland and Paris and also during short return visits while residing abroad, Watson would show drawings and paintings in group shows sponsored by the Buffalo Society of Artists. (Note: Formed at about the same time as the school of the Buffalo Art Students' League, the Society of Artists was a membership organization that put on exhibitions of works produced by its members.)

After she had established her primary residence in Manhattan and completed training at the Art Students League of New York and privately with William Merritt Chase, Watson contributed paintings to quite a few group shows at the Whitney Studio Gallery and its successors. Commenting on a 1917 show at the Studio Gallery, a local critic called attention to "a colorful little still life of gladiolus against a blue background". This painting, now owned by the Smithsonian American Art Museum, is shown above, "Untitled (Gladiolus)", image no. 3. Reviewing the same show, another critic found her painting of Robert Barker to be "weak in drawing" but having "quite unusual fineness of color" and another said it had "feeling and intention in color and design". Other Whitney group shows took place in 1924, 1925, 1932, 1934, 1935, 1936, 1938, and 1940. Watson's still life called "Plums" was featured in the catalog for the first Whitney Biennial which opened in November 1932. In 1928, the museum purchased Watson's portrait called "Rose".

When she contributed paintings to a group exhibition in 1917 at the Knoedler Galleries, the New York Times printed a reproduction of a portrait called "Young Girl" from the show. Late in the year, she showed a still life in a group show at the Scott and Fowles Gallery. The painting was untitled but a critic referred to it as "a colorful little still life of gladiolus against a blue background" and this suggests that it might be the watercolor, now owned by the Smithsonian American Art Museum, shown above, no. 3.

Other group shows in this period included ones at the Albright Art Gallery (Buffalo (1922), the Durand-Ruel Gallery (Manhattan, 1923, and Paris, 1924), the Marie Sterner Gallery (New York, 1925 and 1934), the Arden Gallery (New York, 1925), and the National Academy of Design (1927). A review of the Marie Sterner exhibition said that Watson's "Lilies" (shown above, image no. 4) was "a harmony in blue and white finely realized textures, held to formal beauty of design."

In 1928 and 1931, she showed at the Downtown Galleries in New York and in 1932 in a traveling exhibition sponsored by the College Art Association. She participated three times (1932, 1939, and 1940) in shows at the Corcoran Gallery in Washington. In reviewing the first of these, the Evening Post reproduced her portrait entitled "Beatrice" and in reviewing the third the Evening Star reproduced her portrait "Modern Puritan" (shown above, image no. 5).

In 1933, the recently opened Museum of Modern Art in New York included Watson's "Tulips" (shown above, image no. 6) in a show of fruit and flower paintings by American and European modern artists. (Note: In addition to Watson, the painters represented in this show included Georges Braque, Alexander Brook, Charles Burchfield, Paul Cézanne, Charles Demuth, André Derain, Henri Fantin-Latour, Ernest Fiene, Anne Goldthwaite, Adele Herter, Morris Kantor, Bernard Karfiol, Yasuo Kuniyoshi, Édouard Manet, Henri Matisse, Claude Monet, Georgia O'Keeffe, Odilon Redon, Pierre-Auguste Renoir, Henri Rousseau, Charles Sheeler, Eugene Speicher, Bradley Walker Tomlin, Vincent van Gogh, and Maurice de Vlaminck.) The following year her still life called "Fruit in Blue Jar" was shown at the Venice Biennial (shown above, image no. 7).

Other group exhibitions included a pair at the Phillips Memorial Gallery (1935 and 1940) and appearances in the Washington Artists' Studio House and the Modern Art Gallery in Washington. Regarding the 1940 Phillips show, Leila Mechlin of the Evening Star wrote that Watson's flower painting and two portraits had "a dash of personality but no stability". Of the same show, a critic for Art News said: "Nan Watson in 'Plums' exhibits a composition of red plums in various stages of ripeness against a violet-striped sky-blue foulard. This oil is fully drawn and painted, as her things usually are." The painting is shown above, image no. 8.

She participated in group exhibitions at the Kraushaar Galleries (1939 and 1943), the World's Fair in New York (1940), the Council of French Relief Societies (New York, 1944), and the Ferargil Gallery (New York, 1946). The World's Fair show included "Modern Puritan" again drawing notice from an Evening Star critic who said it was "one of the best in the show".

== Artistic style ==
Nan Watson paints portraits, flowers, and still lifes with a quiet passion of understanding that gets to the heart of essences. There is never anything sensational in her work. She does not first essay to attract the eye, by whatever means seem most plangently annunciatory, and afterward to justify that summons. Instead, she paints with the poet's sincere impulse to realize what waits within. There is true mysticism here, in that the poet and the theme are one—again to advance what, if intangible, cannot possibly be dispensed with if we are to have art of genuine significance. The brushwork is sensitive and unobtrusive, It goes about its task with no fanfare; is reticent and at the same time never timid or groping. The field is thronged with artists who paint flowers; many of these artists are highly successful, though few are seen to arrive at the goal of superlative distinction. Among those who do attain this coveted goal, Nan Watson must certainly be numbered.

— Edward Alden Jewell, "Exhibition by Nan Watson", New York Times April 29, 1932, p. 14

Watson worked mostly in oil on canvas or watercolor on paper. Her choice of subjects, media, and style varied little during the course of her career. Critics noted some aesthetic qualities that distinguished her work. These included charm, fragility, veracity and honesty, forthrightness and directness, and poetic feeling. Regarding her technique they mentioned draftsmanship, rhythmic line, and harmonious composition or design. They also noted clarity and simplicity or lack of pretense. They most frequently called attention to her handling of color, including fresh color values, brilliance, vibrating effect, translucence, and plangency.

Regarding her flower paintings, a critic wrote of a "nice feeling for spatial relations and plastic design that gives significance to the harmonious arrangements of line and contour" adding that "there is also sympathy with that transient moment of beauty which gives animation and vividness to these canvases." Another wrote: "Only the professional critic and fellow artist is conscious of the careful elimination, the sound structure and the sensitive orchestration of color which underlie [the] apparent simplicity" of her paintings. This critic also said, "While seemingly adhering to visual reality, Mrs. Watson accomplishes the difficult compromise of translating her subject into carefully organized structural designs. Her compositions, however charming and colorful they may be, never become merely pretty and sentimental. Regarding her portraits, one said, "The same surety of draftsmanshlp, of fine perception that pierces to the essentials and well-related color serve the artist in her portraiture." Of both flower paintings and portraits, a critic noted, unobtrusive brushwork that was "reticent and at the same time never timid or groping."

== Personal life and family ==
Watson was born in Edinburgh on September 13, 1876. Her father was William Paterson (born 1842 in Edinburgh, died 1914 in Illinois) and her mother was Jemina Hardie Paterson (born 1843 in Dundee–died 1936 in Illinois). Her father's brother-in-law, James N. Adam, was a merchant who left Scotland in 1872 to found a successful department store in New Haven, Connecticut. William emigrated in 1878 and took a position with the firm, J. N. Adam & Co. Adam relocated to Buffalo in 1882. William continued to work in the New Haven business until 1896 when he followed Adam to Buffalo. Watson had two older sisters, Elizabeth and Margaret, an older brother, William, a younger sister, Alice, and a younger brother, John.

The reticence at least one critic saw in her work seems to have been present in her life as well. Readily available published sources contain no personal interviews. She appears to have published no writings. Her students and friends appear not to have left any descriptions of her personal life. A chief source of information about her personal life is the biography of her husband written by Lenore Clark:Forbes Watson: Independent Revolutionary (Kent State University Press, 2001). The book reports that Watson remained close to her Scottish roots, even speaking with a slight accent despite her American upbringing. It says she often traveled to Scotland for family visits.

Clark reports that Watson was modest and "astute, though quietly so" She had an "alert intelligence and wry sense of humor". She dressed conventionally, was less than average in height, and wore little makeup. A 1941 news source partly corroborates this description of her appearance, saying she was a "demure unassuming flower-like person".

In 1917, Watson and her husband went to France as war volunteers, he as an ambulance driver and she as a "canteener" in the Canteen Service of the American Red Cross. Women volunteers in the Red Cross Canteen Service provided coffee, snacks, and whole meals to soldiers in transit to and from battle zones and sometimes in evacuation hospitals behind the front lines.

When she was 81, in 1957, Watson was afflicted by a lung disease said to be near death. Nan's sister and brother helped pay medical bills. She remained weak leaving the hospital.

Watson died on September 15, 1966, in Washington, D.C.

=== Other names used ===
Before her marriage, Watson used the names Agnes Paterson, Agnes C. Paterson, and Agnes Christian Paterson. Sources sometimes misspelled her surname as Patterson. After her marriage in 1910, she adopted Nan Watson as her professional name. The forename came from her childhood when she was called Nan or Nannie. She was known by her married name Mrs. Forbes Watson and as Agnes Paterson Watson.
