= Alexandre Zelkine =

French folk music singer and rail transport modelist (1938–2022)

- Born: 14 February 1938; Lyon, France
- Died: 3 December 2022 (aged 84); Le Mans, France
- Occupations: Folk music singer Rail transport modelist

Alexandre Zelkine (14 February 1938 – 3 December 2022), also called Alexander Zelkin or Sasha Zelkin, was a French folk music singer and rail transport modelist. He was an active singer in the 1960s and 70s in North America.

== Biography ==
=== Family and early life ===
Zelkine was born in Lyon on 14 February 1938 to a Russian father and French mother. His daughter, Ludmilla Zelkine, was a pioneer of rap in Quebec under the stage name Blondie B.

Zelkine traveled to Balkans (notably by train), lived in the Middle East and New York, and finally settled in Montreal in January 1966.

=== Folk singer ===
In 1965, Zelkine published an album of Russian folk songs titled Sasha Sings Folk Songs Of Russia under the pseudonym Sasha Zelkin. In the album, he played the balalaika. In 1966, he published a new album, titled Alexandre Zelkine in association with Capitol Records with songs in French, Yiddish, Spanish, and Russian. That year, he participated in the 24th episode of the Pete Seeger television series Rainbow Quest. His third album, Vol. 2, was released in 1967.

In 1969, Monitor Records produced a new album titled Alexander Zelkin Sings Meadowland and Other Russian Songs, Old and New, a new Russophone album (later reissued by Smithsonian Folkways). The following year, the French edition of the album, La Belle Province: Québec: French-Canadian Folk Songs, was released. Zelkine then signed with United Artists Records, under which the albums Pessimiste and L'otage.

=== Rail transport modelist ===
At the age of 10, Zelkine's father gave him a Jouet de Paris train, which he found distinct from his other toy trains. In 1974, he discovered rail transport modelling. While occupied with his singing, he created many model railways in his homes. He also made scale models, which had their photographs appear in Model Railroader and Loco Revue. He introduced to French-speaking Europe modelling techniques and methods used by North American modellers.

After having practiced the HO scale through five miniature layouts, Zelkine began specializing in the S scale narrow gauge in 1984 and created the fictitious Degulbeef and Cradding Railroad. The project stopped when he returned to France in 1991. However, he produced a new miniature layout from 1998 to 2015, based on the same scale and topic.

=== Death ===
Alexandre Zelkine died in Le Mans on 3 December 2022, at the age of 84.

== Discography ==
- Sasha Sings Folk Songs Of Russia (1965)
- Alexandre Zelkine (1966)
- Vol. 2 (1967)
- Alexander Zelkin Sings Meadowland and Other Russian Songs, Old and New (1969)
- La Belle Province: Québec: French-Canadian Folk Songs (1970)
- Pessimiste (1973)
- L'otage (1974)

== Bibliography ==
- La Degulbeef & Cradding Railroad - Histoire et construction d'un réseau miniature minier et forestier, LR Presse (2015)
- The Degulbeef & Cradding Railroad: History and Construction of a Mining and Logging Model Layout, Arizona Hobbies LLC, Benchmark Publications (2016)
