= Stephen Addiss =

American art historian, musician, and artist (1935–2022)

- Addiss performing on Rainbow Quest (1966)
- Born: Stephen Addiss; April 2, 1935; New York City, U.S.
- Died: May 11, 2022
- Education: Harvard University (BA); University of Michigan (MA, PhD)
- Occupations: Art historian; musician; painter; calligrapher
- Known for: Scholarship on Japanese art; the folk duo Addiss & Crofut

Stephen Addiss (April 2, 1935 – May 11, 2022) was an American art historian, musician, painter, and calligrapher. He was a scholar of Japanese art, particularly Zen painting and calligraphy and haiga, and the author of numerous books. Earlier in his career he was, with Bill Crofut, half of the folk-music duo Addiss & Crofut, which toured internationally under United States State Department programs in the 1960s.

== Early life and education ==
Addiss was born in New York City on April 2, 1935. He studied music composition at Harvard University, graduating cum laude in 1957, and continued at the Mannes College of Music. He took an experimental composition course with John Cage at the New School. He later earned a master's degree and a doctorate in East Asian art history at the University of Michigan, completing his PhD in 1977 with his dissertation on Japanese painter Uragami Gyokudo.

== Music career ==
With Bill Crofut, Addiss formed the folk duo Addiss & Crofut, which was active for roughly sixteen years beginning in the early 1960s. The pair toured many countries in Africa and Asia under the sponsorship of the U.S. State Department's cultural-exchange program, performing songs in many languages and were billed as the "troubadours of goodwill." On April 2, 1965, President Lyndon B. Johnson honored Addiss and Crofut at a White House ceremony for their cultural work in Southeast Asia.

The duo recorded for Folkways Records and Columbia Records. Their albums include 400 Years of Folk Music and World Tour with Folk Songs for Folkways and Addiss and Crofut (1967) and Eastern Ferris Wheel (1968) for Columbia. They appeared on national television, including Johnny Carson and "Captain Kangaroo", and on Pete Seeger's folk-music series Rainbow Quest, where they performed with the Vietnamese songwriter Phạm Duy.

== Academic career ==
Addiss taught at the University of Kansas from 1977 to 1992, and then from 1992 at the University of Richmond. At Richmond, he held the Tucker-Boatwright Professorship in the Humanities until his retirement in 2013. His scholarship focused on Japanese literati painting (nanga), Zen painting and calligraphy, haiku, and haiga (haiku painting).

His grants and awards included a presidential award in 1965, a Fulbright-Hays scholarship to Japan in 1981, a Korean government cultural grant in 1979 and grants from the National Endowment for the Humanities in 1984 and 1989. Addiss was also an adjunct curator at the New Orleans Museum of Art from 1978 to 1986 and served as honorary curator of the American Haiku Archives at the California State Library, 2009–2010.

He wrote The Art of Zen: Paintings and Calligraphy by Japanese Monks 1600–1925 (Abrams, 1989). He produced a translation of the Tao Te Ching (Hackett, 1993) with Stanley Lombardo. Other books in this field he worked on were The Sound of One Hand: Paintings and Calligraphy of Zen Master Hakuin (with Audrey Yoshiko Seo), 77 Dances: Japanese Calligraphy by Poets, Monks, and Scholars 1568–1868 (Weatherhill, 2006), Zen Sourcebook (Hackett, 2008), and The Art of Haiku (Shambhala, 2012).

Addiss's scholarship was reviewed in leading academic journals, including Monumenta Nipponica, The Journal of Asian Studies, Philosophy East and West, and The Art Bulletin.

In 1968 Addiss composed the music for Emile de Antonio's documentary In the Year of the Pig. He adapted "La Marseillaise" to be played on traditional Vietnamese instruments and wrote an introductory "helicopter concerto" commissioned by the director.

== Artwork ==
Addiss practiced ink painting, calligraphy, and haiga. This work was exhibited in Asia, Europe, and the United States.

== Personal life and death ==
Addiss died on May 11, 2022.

== Selected publications ==
- The Art of Zen: Paintings and Calligraphy by Japanese Monks 1600–1925. New York: Harry N. Abrams, 1989. ISBN 9780810918863.
- Haiga: Takebe Sōchō and the Haiku-Painting Tradition. Richmond: Marsh Art Gallery, 1995.
- Tao Te Ching (translation, with Stanley Lombardo). Indianapolis: Hackett, 1993. ISBN 9780872202320.
- 77 Dances: Japanese Calligraphy by Poets, Monks, and Scholars 1568–1868. New York: Weatherhill, 2006.
- The Art of Haiku: Its History through Poems and Paintings by Japanese Masters. Boston: Shambhala, 2012. ISBN 9781590309582.
