= Paul Mus =

French writer

Paul Mus (1902–1969)

Paul Mus (1902–1969) was a French writer and scholar. His studies focused on Vietnam and other Southeast Asian cultures.

He was born in Bourges to an academic family, and grew up in northern Vietnam (Tonkin). In 1907 his father opened the College de Protectorate in Hanoi and he would graduate from the college some 12 years later.

Mus was a member of The French School of the Far East (French: École Française d'Extrême-Orient, EFEO) since 1927, and "returned to Hanoi in 1927 as a secretary and librarian with the Research Institute of The French School of the Far East until 1940."

At the outbreak of World War II he was serving as a platoon commander leading a colonial unit in combat at Valvin and Sully-sur-Loire for which he would be awarded the Croix de Guerre. In 1942 he joined the Free French Forces in Africa. He trained with British commandos in Ceylon in 1944–1945 and then in January 1945 he was parachuted into Tonkin to rally French and Vietnamese to the Free French cause. He was in Hanoi on 9 March when the Japanese overthrew the Vichy French administration and he then escaped the city and walked 250 miles (400 km) to join up with French colonial forces retreating into southern China.

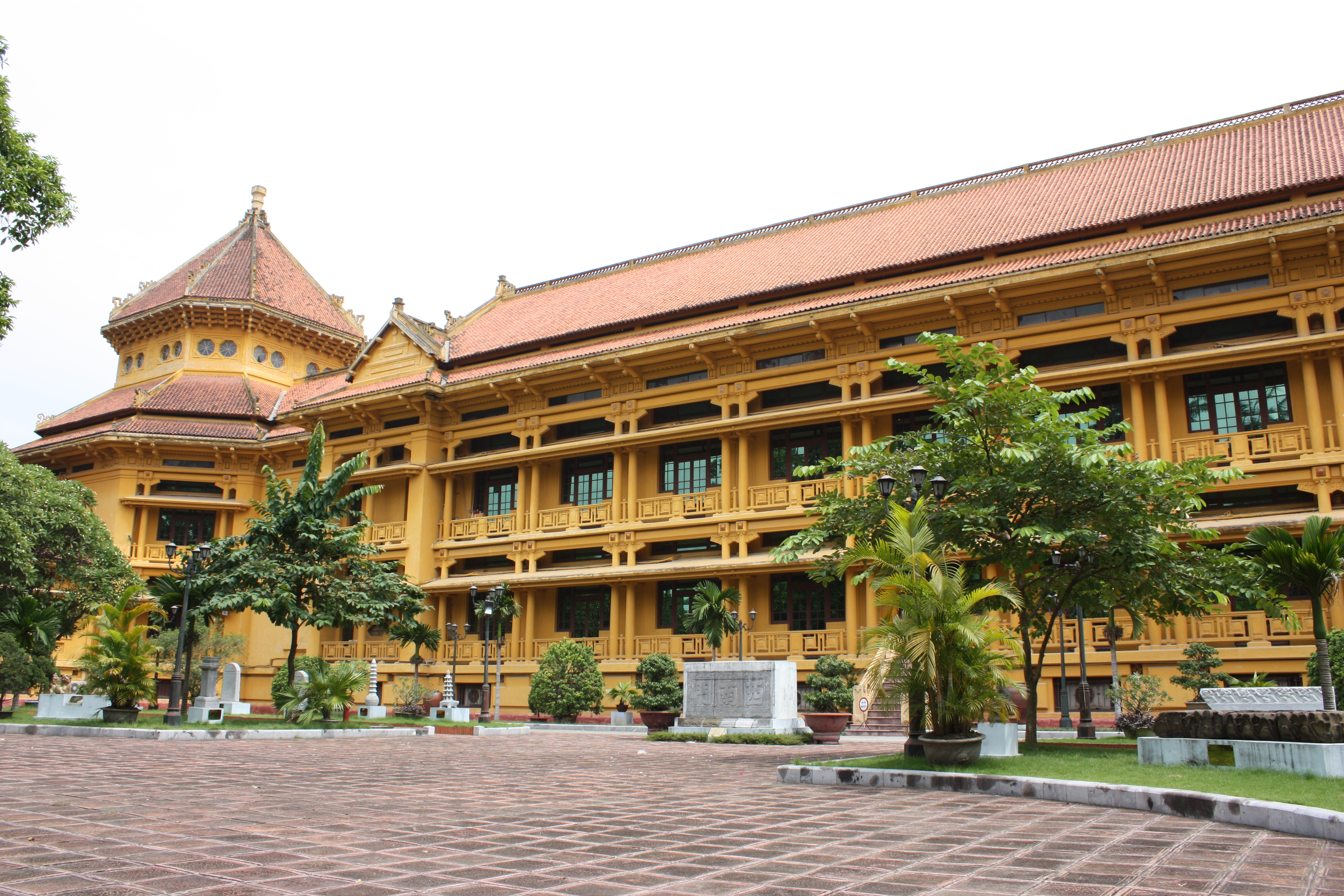
Vietnam National Museum of History, Hanoi, Vietnam. During the colonial period, the building housed The French School of the Far East, where Paul Mus worked for thirteen years, from 1927 to 1940.

On September 2, 1945, he was with General Philippe Leclerc on the USS Missouri to receive the Surrender of Japan for France and subsequently served as his political advisor when France returned to Indochina and started the colonial reconquest. (Note: "Avec le Commandant P. Mus, conseiller politique de Leclerc, il [ Jacques Massu ] obtient la reddition des Caodaistes (8 novembre). (With Maj. P. Mus, political advisor for Leclerc, he [ Jacques Massu ] obtained the surrender of the Caodaists (8 November.)")

In 1947, Mus became the political advisor to Émile Bollaert, the new French High Commissioner of Indochina. On 10 May 1947 Bollaert dispatched Mus to make contact with Ho Chi Minh and after walking 40 miles (64 km) through Viet Minh held territory he arrived at Ho's headquarters on May 12, 1947. Mus had been authorised to offer Ho a ceasefire on three conditions: 1. the Viet Minh were to lay down their weapons, 2. French troops were to be allowed to circulate freely in areas held by them and 3. all French Foreign Legion deserters held by the Viet Minh were to be returned to French control. Ho refused the offer commenting "In the French Union there is no place for cowards, if I accepted these conditions I would be one."

Mus first met Ho Chi Minh in 1945 and recounted in his interview for the 1968 documentary film In the Year of the Pig that: (Note: In the New York Times obituary, according to Paul Mus, Ho Chi Minh said: "I have no army, no diplomacy, no finances, no industry, no public works. All I have is hatred, and I will not disarm it until I feel I can trust you [the French].")

❝ Ho Chi Minh said [in 1945], 'I have no army.' That's not true now [in 1968]. 'I have no army.' 1945. 'I have no finance. I have no diplomacy. I have no public instruction. I have just hatred and I will not disarm it until you give me confidence in you [the French colonialists].' Now this is the thing on which I would insist because it's still alive in his memory, as in mine. For every time Ho Chi Minh has trusted us, we betrayed him.❞ — Paul Mus, 1968 documentary In the Year of the Pig, at the Youtube video time 13:56.

He later served as a professor at both the Collège de France and Yale University. (Note: "In 1949, the head of the Colonial Academy in Paris, Paul Mus, dropped a bombshell when he published a series of articles condemning the army’s use of torture and calling for French negotiations with Ho Chi Minh. He lost his job and ended up in Yale, where he helped get Southeast Asian studies off the ground and influenced the antiwar movement in the United States.".) He wrote widely on Buddhism and comparative linguistics. He was deeply affected by the death of his son Émile Mus in 1961 during the Algerian War.

Mus is survived by a daughter, Laurence Émilie Rimer (née Mus); his son-in-law, J. Thomas Rimer, is also a scholar of Asia, specializing in Japanese literature and drama.
