= Norman Studer =

American progressive educator and folklorist (1902–1978)

- Studer on Rainbow Quest (1966)
- Born: September 7, 1902; Whitehouse, Ohio, U.S.
- Died: October 27, 1978 (aged 76)
- Education: Columbia University (AB, AM)
- Occupations: Educator; folklorist; author
- Known for: Director of Camp Woodland and the Downtown Community School; Catskills folklore collecting
- Spouse: Hannah Studer
- Children: 1

Norman Studer (September 7, 1902 – October 27, 1978) was an American progressive educator, folklorist, and author. He directed the Downtown Community School in Manhattan and co-founded and led Camp Woodland in the Catskills, where he organized efforts to collect the folklore and folk song of the region. He co-edited the scholarly collection Folk Songs of the Catskills (1982).

== Early life and education ==
Studer was born on September 7, 1902, in Whitehouse, Ohio. After three years at Oberlin College following World War I, he completed an AB in history at Columbia University in 1929 and an AM in political science there in 1931, and was editor of a New York newspaper, The New Student.

== Career in education ==
Studer began teaching in 1931 at the Erie Day School in Erie, Pennsylvania. He had studied education under John Dewey at Columbia and from 1933 he taught at the Little Red School House and later the Elisabeth Irwin High School, both of which are progressive schools in lower Manhattan. He taught and administered through about 1951.

From 1951 to 1970 he served as director of the Downtown Community School, a progressive, cooperative, and racially integrated school in Manhattan founded in 1944. The school closed in 1971 just a year after his departure. Studer built much of the school's history curriculum around direct encounters with primary sources rather than just from textbooks. For example, eighth-graders spent weekends studying colonial Kingston and Hurley in the Catskills, interviewed elderly residents of a Manhattan day center as part of a 1953 oral-history project and visited a restored seventeenth-century schoolhouse on Staten Island in 1955, a trip Studer described as building "a bridge to the past." In a 1955 New York Times feature on the school's parent-teacher discussions, Studer argued that children need firm, adult-set limits as well as room to experiment within them.

From 1938 Studer was on the staff of Camp Hilltop, a progressive educational summer camp, first as head counselor and then as director of education. After Camp Hilltop closed in 1940, Studer and its former director co-founded Camp Woodland in Phoenicia in the Catskills, where he served as director until 1962. The camp was a progressive, racially and economically integrated community that grew out of New Deal-era ideals. Singer Pete Seeger was a frequent visitor and performer.

In 1956 the New York State Joint Legislative Committee on Charitable and Philanthropic Agencies and Organizations investigated Camp Woodland for communist indoctrination. Its report identified Studer as a Communist Party member and he was subpoenaed to testify. No charges were filed.

In 1958 Studer personally invited the Little Rock Nine to spend a summer at the camp.

A leadership dispute involving Studer put Camp Woodland's future in doubt in 1961. Former campers and their parents wrote in personal support of Studer, citing the values the experience had instilled in them.

Studer served as master of ceremonies at a Town Hall concert in 1961 in New York honoring Pete Seeger, telling the audience, "Pete Seeger, we honor you and say that this voice of yours must not be silenced!"

== Folklore collecting ==
Beginning in 1941, Studer led Camp Woodland campers on folklore collecting expeditions through the Catskill region. They interviewed aging mountain residents and recorded ballads, songs, stories, and dances. The historian Alfred F. Young, a Camp Woodland counselor in the late 1940s, later recalled admiring how Studer drew an elderly Catskill raftsman into telling the children his life story.

The effort reached communities in the East Branch valley of the Delaware River that were later flooded by the Pepacton Reservoir. The composers and musicologists Norman Cazden and Herbert Haufrecht served as music directors at the camp and also extended this work. The materials gathered became a regional folklore archive. In 1946 Studer chaired the organizing committee for the second annual folklore conference held jointly by Camp Woodland and Elisabeth Irwin High School, whose participants included Alan Lomax, B. A. Botkin, and Pete Seeger.

Studer's publications include the spoken-word album All the Homespun Days: A Narrative Poem of New York State Life (Folkways Records, 1961), and the book A Catskill Woodsman: Mike Todd's Story (Purple Mountain Press, 1988, posthumous). With Norman Cazden and Herbert Haufrecht he co-edited Folk Songs of the Catskills (SUNY Press, 1982), a scholarly volume drawn from the Camp Woodland collecting.

== Television ==
Studer appeared on episode 13 of Pete Seeger's folk-music series Rainbow Quest (1965–66), together with the Catskills folk singer Grant Rogers.

== Death and legacy ==
Studer died on October 27, 1978. His papers are held in the M. E. Grenander Department of Special Collections and Archives at the University at Albany, SUNY. They document his work at the Downtown Community School and Camp Woodland and include manuscripts, photographs, and audio and film recordings of Catskills folklore.

Studer's progressive perspective and his role as co-founder and guiding figure of Camp Woodland have been examined by historians of progressive education. The historian Paul C. Mishler discusses Studer and the camp's applied folklore program in his book Raising Reds (1999), describing Woodland's folklore work as an effort to ground a radical political culture in American folk traditions. A scholarly study of the camp noted that Studer was the educator who shaped it across its twenty-four years.
