= In the Year of the Pig =

1968 film by Emile de Antonio

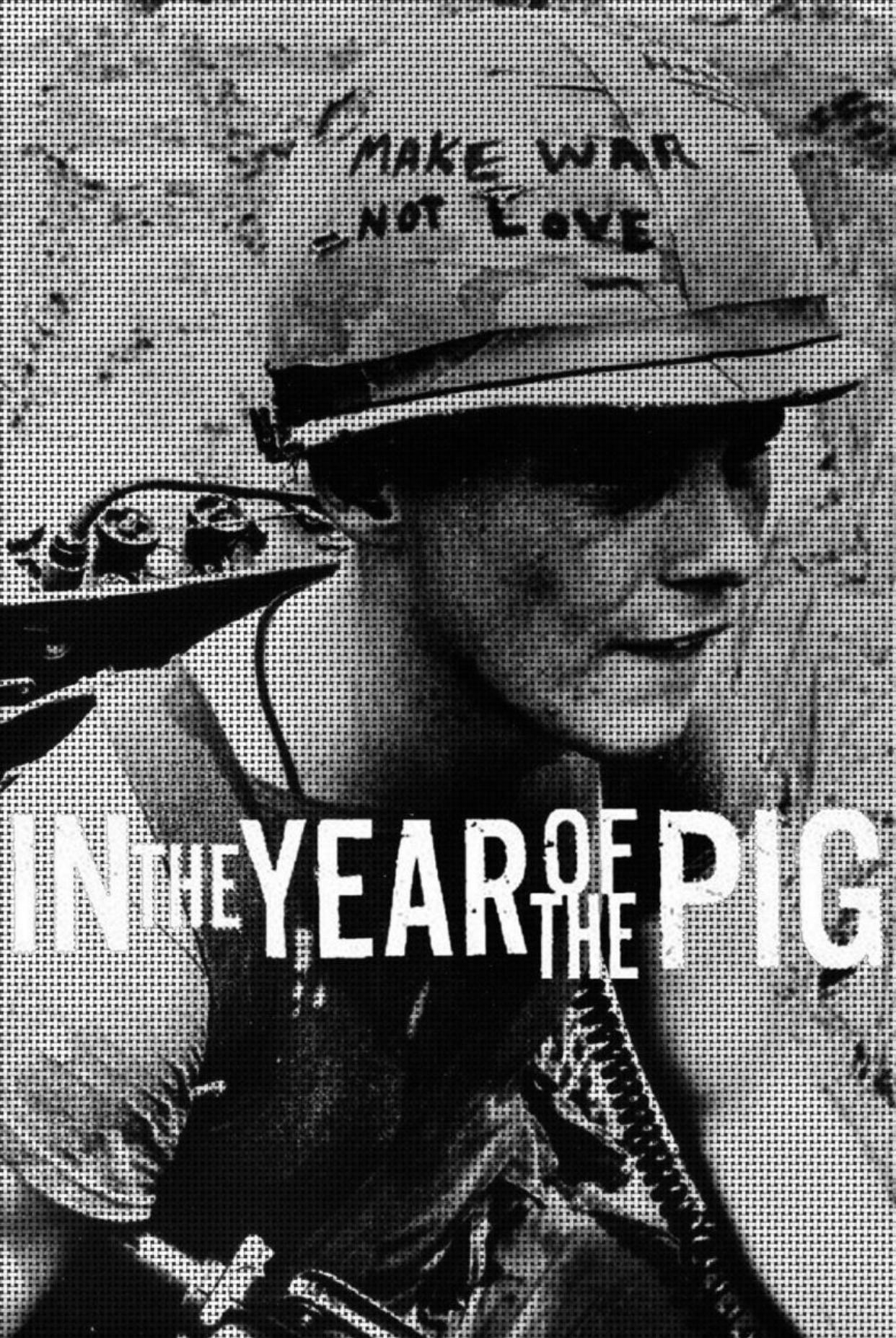
- Directed by: Emile de Antonio
- Produced by: John Attlee; Emile de Antonio; Terry Morrone; Orville Schell
- Edited by: Helen Levitt; Hannah Moreinis; Lynzee Klingman (sup)
- Music by: Steve Addiss
- Distributed by: Pathe Contemporary Films
- Release date: February 26, 1969
- Running time: 104 minutes
- Country: United States
- Language: English

In the Year of the Pig is an American documentary film directed by Emile de Antonio about American involvement in the Vietnam War. (Note: See the full documentary on Youtube: In the Year of the Pig, in which Paul Mus began to talk at video time 6:26. See also Section External links.) It was released in 1968 while the U.S. was in the middle of its military engagement, and was politically controversial. One year later, the film was nominated for the Academy Award for Best Documentary Feature. In 1990, Jonathan Rosenbaum characterized the film as "the first and best of the major documentaries about Vietnam".

== Summary ==
The film, which is in black and white, contains much historical footage and many interviews. Those interviewed include Harry Ashmore, Daniel Berrigan, Philippe Devillers, David Halberstam, Roger Hilsman, Jean Lacouture, Kenneth P. Landon, Thruston B. Morton, Paul Mus, Charlton Osburn, Harrison Salisbury, Ilya Todd, John Toller, David K. Tuck, David Wurfel and John White.

Produced during the Vietnam War, the film was greeted with hostility by many audiences, with bomb threats and vandalism directed at theaters that showed it. When confronted with the charge that In the Year of the Pig had a leftist perspective, de Antonio conceded the point, replying: “Only God is objective, and he doesn’t make films.”

== Home media ==
In the Year of the Pig was released as a region 1 DVD in 2005. In addition to the film, the DVD has audio commentary with director Emile de Antonio composed from archival sources, an interview with de Antonio, and liner notes by de Antonio scholar Douglas Kellner.

== Influences ==
A still photograph used in the film that displayed Marine Corporal Michael Wynn later was incorporated into the album cover for The Smiths' second album Meat Is Murder (1985). The insignia on Wynn's helmet was changed to "meat is murder".

== See also ==
- Hearts and Minds, the Oscar-winning 1974 documentary film by Peter Davis
- Modernist film
