= Rex Brasher =

American painter (1869–1960)

- Self-portrait
- Born: July 31, 1869; Brooklyn, New York, US
- Died: February 29, 1960 (aged 90); Gaylordsville, Connecticut, US
- Known for: Watercolor paintings of birds
- Notable work: Birds & Trees of North America

Rex Brasher (July 31, 1869 – February 29, 1960) was an American watercolor painter and ornithologist in the vein of John James Audubon and Louis Agassiz Fuertes. Brasher's 875 surviving paintings depicted 1,200 species and sub-species of North American birds in accurate detail, representing all the species and sub-species identified in the American Ornithologists’ Union’s Checklist of North American Birds.

== Biography ==
Born in Brooklyn, Brasher started to paint birds at the age of 16. He traveled throughout the United States, visiting every state in an effort to find birds to paint, betting on horse races and working odd jobs to support his travels. In 1911, he purchased a 150-acre farm, which he called Chickadee Valley, in Kent, Connecticut. In 1924, Brasher completed his magnum opus, Birds and Trees of North America, which was published in a limited run of 100 twelve-volume copies. In 1939, his paintings were exhibited at the Explorers Hall of the National Geographic Society in Washington, D.C.

Brasher died in 1960 at home in Gaylordsville, Connecticut, at the age of 90.

== Artwork ==
The State of Connecticut purchased Brasher's collection of original paintings in 1941 for $74,000, intending to build a gallery to showcase the collection at Kent Falls State Park. Funding never materialized, so the paintings moved to Harkness Memorial State Park in southern Connecticut, where they were exhibited starting in 1953, following a decade in the basement of the Connecticut State Library in Hartford.

The collection was transferred to the University of Connecticut in 1988. It is held at the Thomas J. Dodd Research Center.
