= Across Your Dreams =

- Crofut Productions CD, 008-CP

Studio album by Frederica von Stade
- Released: 1995
- Studio: Bill Crofut's home
- Genre: Crossover
- Length: 63:18
- Language: English
- Label: Crofut Productions
- Producer: Bill Crofut and Chris Brubeck

Across Your Dreams
- Telarc CD, CD-80467

Across Your Dreams: Frederica von Stade Sings Brubeck is a studio crossover album. It exists in two versions. The first, released by Crofut Productions in 1995, is a 63-minute CD performed by von Stade with Edward Arron, Frank Brown, Joel Brown, Chris Brubeck, Dan Brubeck, Bill Crofut and Mark Vinci. The second, released by Telarc in 1996, is a 58-minute CD performed by the same artists and von Stade's elder daughter, Jenny Elkus.

== Background, writing and recording ==
The album is the fruit of a long friendship between the Crofut and Brubeck families. Bill Crofut first got to know the Brubecks when he bought a house near theirs in the 1960s. He employed the young Chris Brubeck as a babysitter.

Crofut met Frederica von Stade in 1973, when his frequent recital partner, the baritone Benjamin Luxon, was appearing with von Stade in Mozart's The Marriage of Figaro at the Glyndebourne Festival. When Crofut and von Stade renewed their acquaintance at the Tanglewood Festival two decades later, it occurred to Crofut that marrying von Stade's classical artistry with the Brubecks' compositions might be an experiment worth trying.

To avoid the stress of renting space in a studio, Crofut set up a makeshift recording facility in the living room of his home in Sandisfield, a town set in the tranquillity of Massachusetts's Berkshire Hills. Working with von Stade and Chris Brubeck in an atmosphere of collegial informality, he spen two years developing an album in which most of the music was notably allusive and personal.

"La paloma azul", for example, was a tribute to a live recording of the piece that Dave Brubeck had made while touring Mexico in 1967. "Across your dreams" was composed by Chris Brubeck when he was a youngster on the threshold of a musical career. "Summer song" was written for Louis Armstrong to perform in The Real Ambassadors, Dave and Iola Brubeck's musical about the State Department's Cultural Exchange programme, a project in which both Crofut and Dave Brubeck were enthusiastic participants.

"Polly", conceived as an instrumental piece, acquired its lyrics from a visiting poet, Alastair Reid, as well as from Crofut, Chris Brubeck and von Stade. (Its title referred to both its polytonal harmony and a daughter of one if Crofut's neighbours.) "Blue rondo à la Turk", written in honour of Dave Brubeck's seventy-fifth birthday, commemorated the visit to Turkey during which he had chanced upon its 9/8 rhythm. "It's a raggy waltz" incorporated a quotation from Der Rosenkavalier that von Stade had inserted as a joke. And Chris Brubeck's lyrics for "In the grace of your room" and "It's lonely at both ends of the road" echoed his own experiences as a father, a husband and a musician on tour.

The album was first released by Crofut's own label. Major changes were made when it was reissued by Telarc. "Koto song", "Tritonis" and "Traveler's blues" were dropped; "Strange meadowlark" and "Heart of winter" were added; and "Blue rondo" and "Across your dreams" were re-recorded, with Bill Crofut's place in the latter being taken by Jenny Elkus, the elder of von Stade's children. (Some supplementary recording was undertaken at Fantasy Studios, Berkeley, California.)

An account of the making of the album is given in Fred Hall's It's about time: the Dave Brubeck story (1996).

== Cover art ==
The cover of the first version of the album was designed by Jane McWhorter, and features a painting by Bill Crofut's wife, Susan Crofut. (After Bill Crofut's death, Susan Crofut married his friend and colleague, Benjamin Luxon.) The cover of the second version of the album was designed by Susan Cybulski under the art direction of Anilda Carrasquillo, and features a photograph of von Stade taken by E. J. Camp.

== Critical reception ==
Ken Dryden reviewed the second version of the album for allmusic.com. It was, he wrote, an unusually successful example of a crossover disc. Each of its items was at least in part the work of either Chris Brubeck or his father, Dave, but its star, Frederica von Stade, was no jazz or folk singer but rather a guest from the world of opera.

Von Stade sang on all but one of the album's tracks, and was the sole vocalist on seven of them. [Chris Brubeck had intended her to join him on "Thinking of you thinking of me", but she considered his solo version of the piece to be perfect without her.] In Dave and Iola Brubeck's "Strange meadowlark" she was "captivating", and in the dissonant gorgeousness of "The distance between us" she was "mesmerizing".

There were four tracks on which von Stade sang with one or more of her hosts. She was joined by Bill Crofut in the ballad "Summer song". It was obvious that she had enjoyed herself hugely in sharing the comedy of "It's a raggy waltz" and the polytonal "Polly" with Crofut and Chris Brubeck. In the former, it was she who was responsible for the jeu d'esprit of an interpolated fragment of Der Rosenkavalier. And in one number, "Across your dreams", she duetted with a seeming folk singer who was actually her daughter, Jenny Elkus.

All in all, the album was a "superb" production that had much to recommend it. Bill Crofut was a charming singer, and equally at home in several different kinds of banjo music. Chris Brubeck was a "formidable songwriter", a first class exponent of the trombone and the bass and a pianist whose skill at the keyboard was widely underestimated. Fans of either of them would buy the disc as a matter of course. Von Stade's admirers should allow it a fair hearing too.

In The Advocate, the album was praised as "a true crossover hit". It was also reviewed in Classic CD, Clyde T. McCants's American opera singers and their recordings (2004) and Donald Clarke's The Penguin encyclopedia of popular music (1998).

== Track listings ==
First version

1. (3:05) "Across your dreams"; music by Chris Brubeck, lyrics by Chris Brubeck, Amos Jessup and Jim Montgomery; vocals by Frederica von Stade and Bill Crofut
2. (4:27) "Koto song"; music by Dave Brubeck
3. (2:46) "Summer song"; music by Dave Brubeck, lyrics by Iola Brubeck; vocals by Frederica von Stade and Bill Crofut
4. (4:12) "The distance between us"; music by Chris Brubeck, lyrics by Susan Dias, with additional lyrics by Alastair Reid; vocal by Frederica von Stade
5. (5:16) "Tritonis"; music by Dave Brubeck
6. (4:35) "Blue rondo - à la Turk"; music by Dave Brubeck, lyrics by Bill Crofut and Chris Brubeck; vocals by Frederica von Stade, Chris Brubeck and Bill Crofut
7. (5:15) "It's a raggy waltz"; music and lyrics by Dave Brubeck; vocals by Frederica von Stade, Bill Crofut, Chris Brubeck and Joel Brown
8. (4:58) "Traveling blues"; music by Dave Brubeck
9. (5:44) "Polly"; music by Dave Brubeck, lyrics by Chris Brubeck, Bill Crofut, Frederica von Stade and Alastair Reid; vocals by Frederica von Stade, Bill Crofut and Chris Brubeck
10. (4:04) "Autumn in our town"; music by Dave Brubeck, lyrics by Iola Brubeck, with additional lyrics by Chris Brubeck; vocal by Frederica von Stade
11. (6:25) "Thinking of you thinking of me"; music, lyrics and vocal by Chris Brubeck
12. (3:02) "In the grace of your room"; music by Jeff Jones, lyrics by Chris Brubeck; vocal by Frederica von Stade
13. (3:24) "Lonely at both ends of the road"; music and lyrics by Chris Brubeck; vocal by Frederica von Stade
14. (6:05) "La paloma azul (The blue dove)"; traditional, arranged by Bill Crofut and Chris Brubeck; vocal by Frederica von Stade

Second version

1. (4:12) "The distance between us"; music by Chris Brubeck, lyrics by Susan Dias, with additional lyrics by Alastair Reid; vocal by Frederica von Stade
2. (6:00) "La paloma azul (The blue dove)"; traditional, arranged by Bill Crofut and Chris Brubeck; vocal by Frederica von Stade
3. (3:47) "Strange meadowlark"; music by Dave Brubeck, lyrics by Iola Brubeck; vocal by Frederica von Stade
4. (3:06) "Across your dreams" (re-recorded); music by Chris Brubeck, lyrics by Chris Brubeck, Amos Jessup and Jim Montgomery; vocals by Frederica von Stade and Jenny Elkus
5. (2:51) "Summer song"; music by Dave Brubeck, lyrics by Iola Brubeck; vocals by Frederica von Stade and Bill Crofut
6. (5:50) "Polly"; music by Dave Brubeck, lyrics by Chris Brubeck, Bill Crofut, Frederica von Stade and Alastair Reid; vocals by Frederica von Stade, Bill Crofut and Chris Brubeck
7. (4:52) "Blue rondo - a tribute to Dave" (re-recorded); music by Dave Brubeck, lyrics by Bill Crofut and Chris Brubeck; vocals by Frederica von Stade, Chris Brubeck and Bill Crofut
8. (4:08) "Autumn in our town"; music by Dave Brubeck, lyrics by Iola Brubeck, with additional lyrics by Chris Brubeck; vocal by Frederica von Stade
9. (6:33) "Thinking of you thinking of me"; music, lyrics and vocal by Chris Brubeck
10. (5:19) "It's a raggy waltz"; music and lyrics by Dave Brubeck; vocals by Frederica von Stade, Bill Crofut, Chris Brubeck and Joel Brown
11. (4:29) "Heart of winter"; music by Chris Brubeck, lyrics by Alastair Reid and Chris Brubeck; vocal by Frederica von Stade
12. (3:03) "In the grace of your room"; music by Jeff Jones, lyrics by Chris Brubeck; vocal by Frederica von Stade
13. (3:27) "Lonely on both ends of the road"; music and lyrics by Chris Brubeck; vocal by Frederica von Stade

== Personnel ==
=== Musical ===
- Frederica von Stade (b. 1945), vocals
- Jenny Elkus (b. 1977), vocals (second version)
- Bill Crofut (1935-1999), banjo and vocals, and producer
- Chris Brubeck (b. 1952), trombone, electric bass, acoustic bass, piano and vocals, and producer
- Joel Brown, guitar and vocals
- Frank Brown, clarinet
- Edward Arron, cello
- Mark Vinci, flute
- Dan Brubeck, drums and percussion

=== Other ===
- Chris Brown, recording and mixing engineer and digital editor at Person to Person Productions, Litchfield, Connecticut
- Ron Bach, digital editor
- Richard Duarte, engineering assistant at Fantasy Studios

== Release history ==
The first version of the album was released by Crofut Productions on CD in 1995 (catalogue number 008-CP). The second version of album was released by Telarc on CD in 1996 (catalogue number CD-80467), accompanied by a 16-page booklet containing the lyrics of all the songs, a black and white photograph of von Stade, Bill Crofut and Chris Brubeck and two pages of essays by von Stade, Bill Crofut and Chris Brubeck about how the recording was made.
