= Mark Vinci =

American jazz musician

Mark Vinci is a saxophone player who has performed, toured, or recorded with Maria Schneider, Joe Lovano, Stefon Harris, Rosemary Clooney, Tony Bennett, Frank Sinatra, Zoot Sims, Benny Carter, Tommy Flanagan, Clark Terry, Mel Lewis, Michael Feinstein, Joe LaBarbera, and Gene Bertoncini.

== Career ==
As a soloist he has toured Denmark, the Czech Republic, Poland, Germany, and the United States where he has performed in such places as "One Step Down" and "The Nest" in Washington, D.C., "Catalina Bar and Grill" in Los Angeles, and "Birdland" in New York City.

Vinci played lead alto with the Carnegie Hall Jazz Band conducted by Jon Faddis. Vinci also played in the Maria Schneider Jazz Orchestra and John Fedchock’s New York Big Band. Vinci is also a featured soloist for many big bands in the USA and Europe, performing arrangements of his songs and original compositions.

In addition, Vinci is a veteran of Woody Herman and Gerry Mulligan big bands. He has performed at festivals such as North Sea, Kool, Montreaux, Monterey and Nice.

== Recording career ==
Vinci has recorded on many noteworthy record labels, such as Bluenote, Capitol, Concord, Telarc, Sony, and Enja.

== Albums ==
- Across Your Dreams (1996, Telarc Records)
- As I Think About You (1997, IRIS Records)
- Grand Slam (1995, IRIS Records)
- Interplay
