= Norman Cazden =

American composer and researcher (1914–1980)

Norman Cazden (September 23, 1914, in New York City – August 18, 1980, in Bangor, Maine) was an American composer.

The son of Russian immigrants, he studied first at the Juilliard School of Music and New York's City College, and then in 1944 at Harvard University under Aaron Copland and Walter Piston. While still a student at the Juilliard School, he composed for dance companies and wrote his first symphony. He also performed as a concert pianist and was a piano teacher at Juilliard from 1934 to 1949. After 1941, he worked at Camp Woodland in the Catskill Mountains, where he succeeded Herbert Haufrecht as musical director from 1945 to 1960.

Cazden also taught at the Peabody Conservatory, the University of Michigan, and since 1950 at the University of Illinois in Champaign Urbana. After being investigated by the House Un-American Activities Committee, he lost this position in 1953 and received no academic position for the next 16 years. He gave private piano lessons during this time and worked on research on folk music. Beginning in 1969 he taught at the University of Maine.

Cazden composed an operetta, music for the stage, two symphonies, two chamber music concerts, a brass suite, a suite for oboe and strings, a reverb, a string quartet, other chamber works, sonatas and pieces for the piano. In addition, he edited a number of collections of folk songs, including Folk Songs of the Catskills, Dances from the Woodland, the Abelard Folk Song book, Three Catskill Ballads for Orchestra, A Book of Nonsense Songs, American Folk Songs for Children and A Catskill Songbook.

Folk Songs of the Catskills (SUNY Press, 1982) was co-edited with Herbert Haufrecht and Norman Studer drawing on folk songs collected at Camp Woodland.

He also wrote academic articles on topics relating to the philosophy and psychology of music.
