= Little Red School House =

Coordinates: 40°43′37″N 74°00′17″W

Little Red School House and Elisabeth Irwin High School
- (LREI)
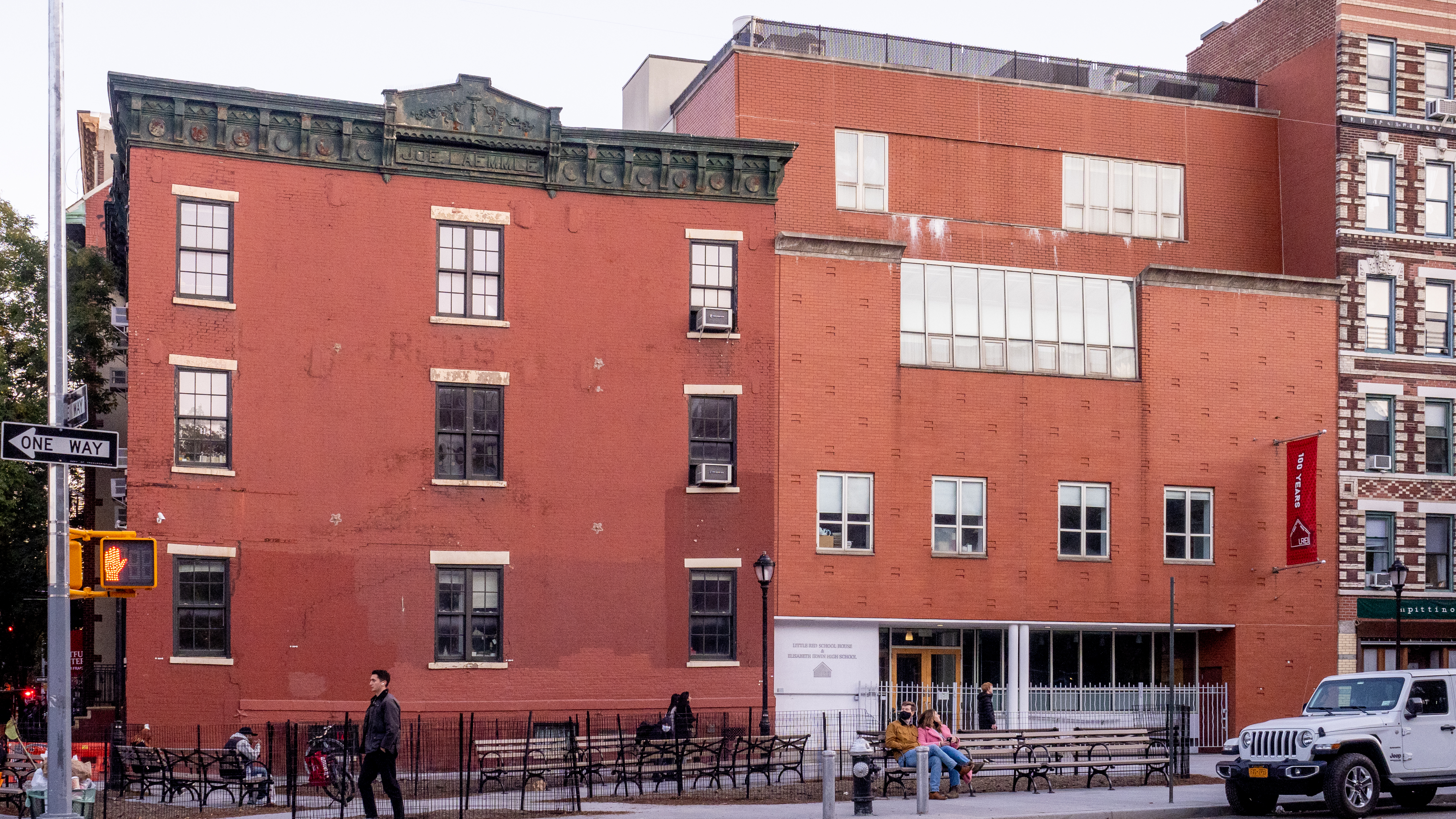

Location
- Lower & Middle School: 272 Sixth Avenue; High School: 40 Charlton Street; Manhattan, New York City, New York; US

Information
- Type: Independent, Coeducational, and College Preparatory School
- Established: 1921
- Founder: Elisabeth Irwin
- Faculty: 107
- Grades: PreK–12
- Campus type: Urban
- Colors: Red & White
- Mascot: The Knight
- Accreditation: NAIS, NYSAIS
- Yearbook: LREI Expressions
- Affiliation: NAIS, NYSAIS, Interschool
- Website: http://www.lrei.org

The Little Red School House and Elisabeth Irwin High School, also referred to as LREI, is a school in Manhattan, New York City. It was founded by Elisabeth Irwin in 1921 as the Little Red School House and is one of the city's first progressive schools. Created as a joint public-private educational experiment, the school tested principles of progressive education that had been advocated since the turn of the 20th century by John Dewey. The founders postulated that the lessons of progressive education could be applied successfully in the crowded, ethnically diverse public schools of the nation's largest city.

== History ==
The school was founded in 1921 as a joint private-public educational experiment by reformer Elisabeth Irwin, and was well known as a testing ground for new concepts in education.

In 1932, after the onset of the Great Depression caused the Public Education Association to withdraw the funding that had allowed the school to exist within the New York City public school system, William O'Shea, the superintendent of schools—who had previously tried to close down the program because of its progressive ideas—announced that the school would be eliminated because of a budgetary crisis. Parents raised sufficient funds to pay for salaries, but O'Shea refused to accept the money, and the school was forced to turn to private funding. It moved to a building on Bleecker Street provided at no cost by the First Presbyterian Church and began a new life as an independent school.

The Little Red School House consists of a lower school, a middle school, and a high school. In the 1940s the Little Red School House's high school students decided they wanted their school to be named after its founder, Elisabeth Irwin, making the full title of the institution The Little Red School House and Elisabeth Irwin High School.

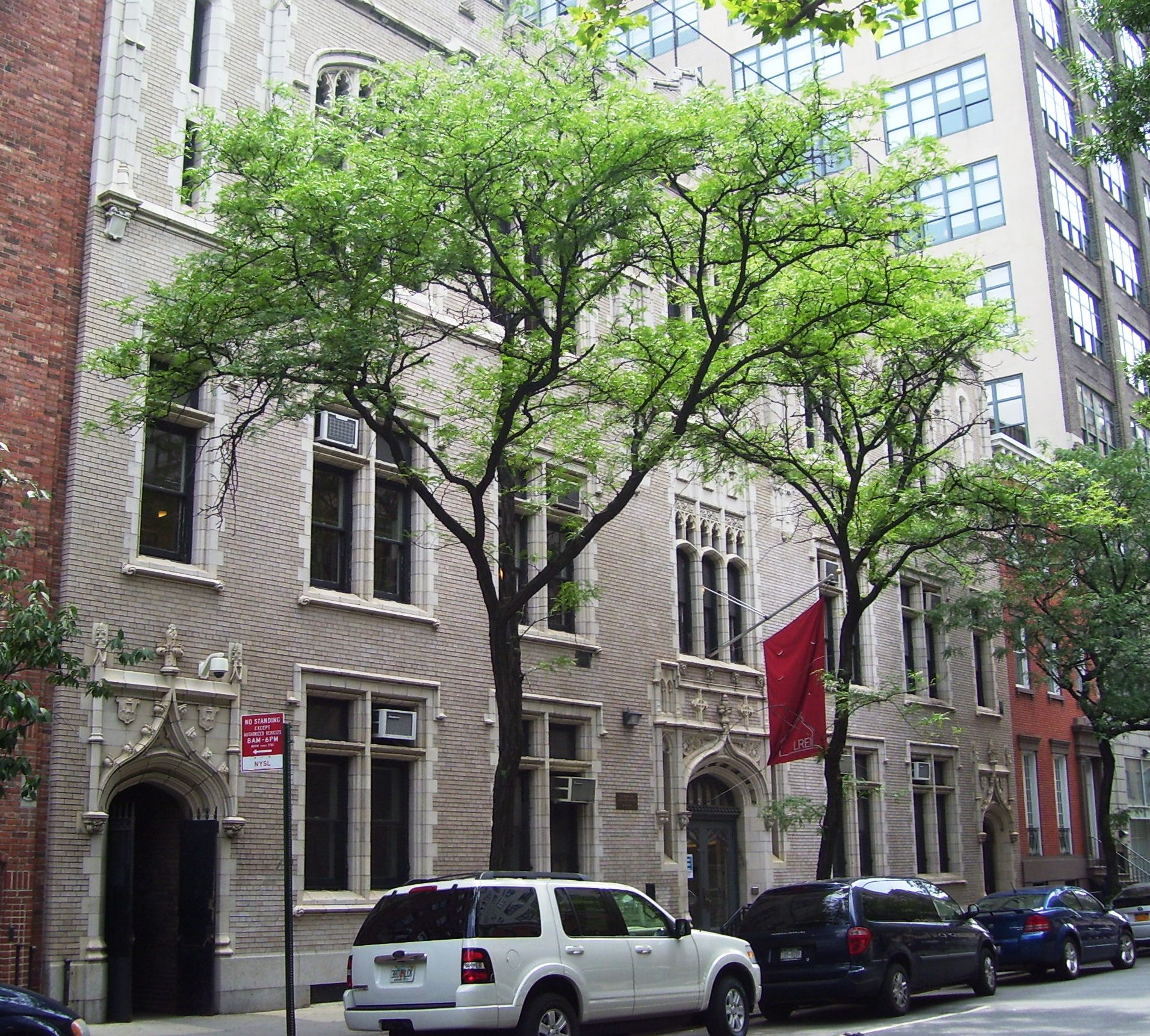
Elisabeth Irwin High School at 40 Charlton Street

== Buildings ==
The Little Red School House and Elisabeth Irwin High School occupy two separate buildings, with a third space housing athletic facilities.

The middle-and-lower-school building is located at 272 Avenue of the Americas (Sixth Avenue) at Bleecker Street, while Elisabeth Irwin High School is at 40 Charlton Street between Sixth Avenue and Varick Street. In June 2008, LREI announced the acquisition of additional space with the purchase of 42 Charlton Street, directly next door. The new townhouse was to be renovated and connected to the existing building. A separate building, the Thompson Street Gym, houses facilities for physical education and athletics. In November 2018, the school announced that it had purchased 15 Van Dam Street, directly behind the Charlton Street campus. The building contains the Soho Playhouse, and formerly housed the Huron Club, a social club frequented by members of the Democratic Party.

== Extracurricular activities ==
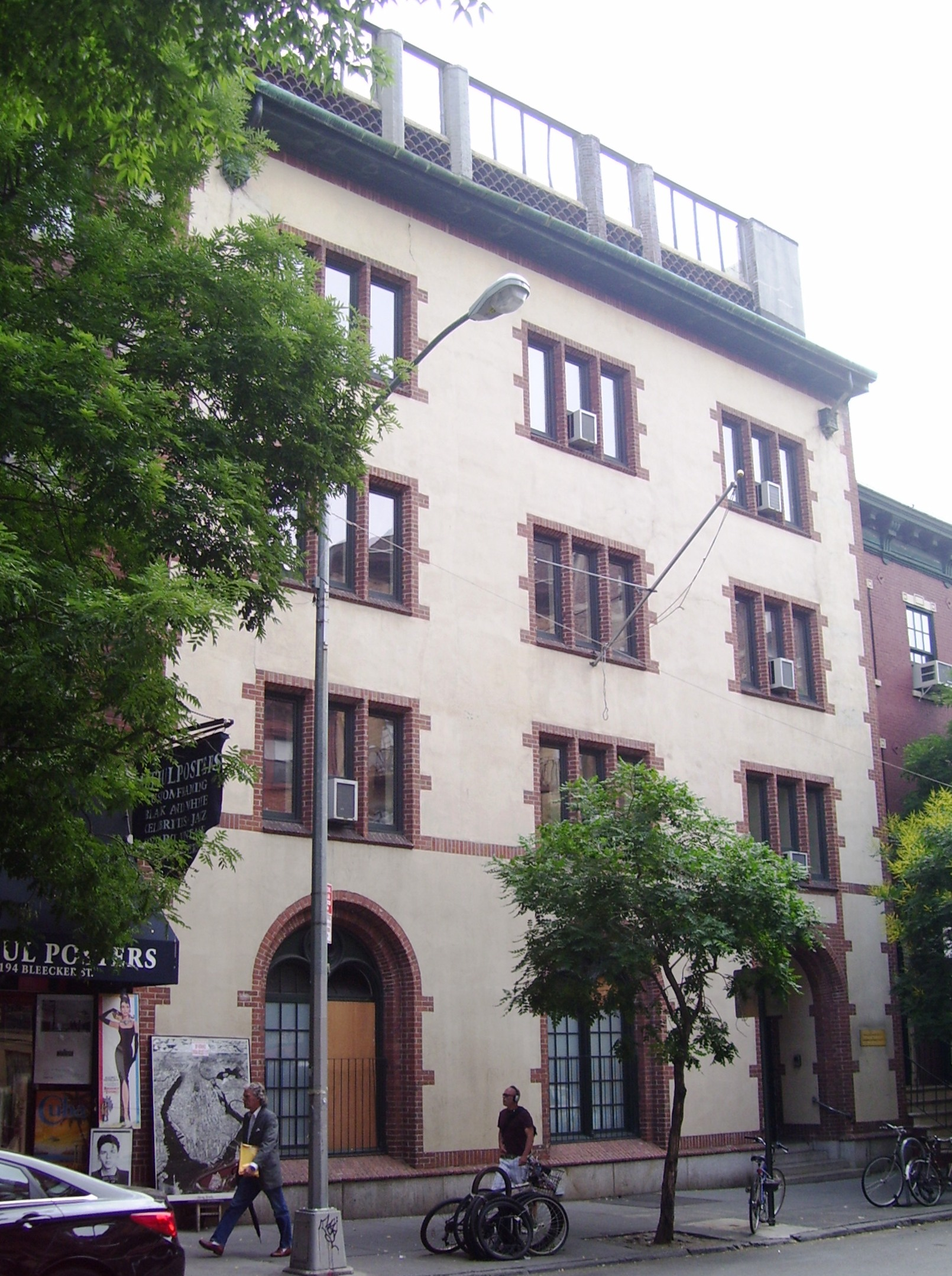
The institution's original home as a private school, at 196 Bleecker Street, is still part of the Bleecker Street/Sixth Avenue complex.

== Directors and leaders ==
Directors

- Elisabeth Irwin (1921–1942)
- Randolph B. Smith (1943–1966)
- F. Coit Johnson II (1966–1975)
- Andrew McLaren (1988–2004)
- Philip Kassen (2004–present)

Current staff

- Director: Philip Kassen
- Assistant Director: Allison Isbell
- High School Principal: Amanda Finigan
- Middle School Principal: Nathan Sokol-Margolis
- Lower School Principal: Heather McKay

== Notable alumni ==
- Elliott Abrams, diplomat, lawyer, political scientist
- Peter Berg, actor, film director, producer, writer
- Kathy Boudin, radical, public health expert
- Emory Cohen, actor
- Angela Davis, political activist
- Dominic DiGesu, musician
- Robert De Niro, actor
- Eric R. Dinallo, Superintendent of Insurance, New York State
- Eric Eisner, lawyer and philanthropist, former president of The Geffen Company
- Emily Green, musician
- Nicolas "Nico" Heller, documentary film director, social media personality
- Foster Hudson, musician
- Mark Kamins, record producer and disc jockey
- Elle King, singer
- Peter Knobler, author
- Michael and Robert Meeropol, sons of Ethel and Julius Rosenberg
- Victor Navasky, professor, Columbia School of Journalism; editor, publisher emeritus, The Nation
- Zac Posen, fashion designer
- Ronald Radosh
- Doug Rauch, musician
- Julie Robinson Belafonte, dancer and actress
- Harris Rosen, philanthropist and entrepreneur, president and chief operating officer, Rosen Hotels & Resorts
- Toshi Seeger, filmmaker and environmental activist
- Dan Shor, actor
- Paul Solman, journalist
- Mary Travers, singer, member of folk group Peter, Paul and Mary
- Benjamin Drake Wright, psychometrician
- Edward Irving Wortis, author
- Daniel Menaker, editor and father of Chapo Trap House host, Will Menaker

== Affiliations ==
The Little Red School House's companion school from 1944 to 1971 was the Downtown Community School (DCS) on the Lower East Side, whose alumni include the writers Peter Manso, Ann Lauterbach, Peter Knobler and Richard Kostelanetz. Its director from 1951 to 1970 was educator and folklorist Norman Studer.

Affiliated organizations

- National Association of Independent Schools
- New York State Association of Independent Schools
- New York Interschool

== See also ==
- The New York Foundation
- Education in New York City
- Elisabeth Irwin
