= Downtown Community School =

American experimental racially integrated school

Coordinates: 40.73083°N 73.98677°W

Information
- Established: 1944
- Closed: 1971

The Downtown Community School was an American experimental, cooperative, racially integrated school located at 235 East 11th Street in the borough of Manhattan in New York City, New York. The school was founded in 1944 and was closed in 1971. Its mission was described as being to train children to “live and work together in understanding.”

School reformer and folklorist Norman Studer was the director from 1951 to 1970. Prominent alumni of the school include Richard Kostelanetz. Parents who sent their children to the school included Bella Abzug, Miriam Makeba, Leonard Boudin, Douglas Turner Ward, Josh White, Dore Ashton. and Margaret Mead. Students who attended the school in its last years included the actor Corey Dee Williams, the graphic novelist Eric Drooker, the poet and translator Vincent Katz, and the literary critic Nicholas Birns.

In the early 1950s, the school employed a music teacher who had been blacklisted because of his refusal to cooperate with the House Un-American Activities Committee. Unable to get concerts because of the blacklist, Pete Seeger was hired to teach singing. The school had links to other progressive private schools such as Little Red School House and The Walden School.

In 1963, the school arranged to teach a group of African-American students who were protesting their assignment to a racially segregated school.

The school closed under financial pressure in 1971, after facing the prospect of raising tuition to cover increased mortgage costs.
