= Kabir Sehgal discography =

Discography of musician, composer and producer Kabir Sehgal.

== Discography ==
=== As leader ===
- Threshold (2021)
- Angela’s Ring: An Opera Revue of the European Debt Crisis (2021)
- Unfolding (2022)
- Guitar Spring: Music for a New Season (2024)
- bells and beats: retro reflections on the holidays (lofi volume 1) (2025)
- stars and static 2026: textured takes on 250 years of america, lofi vol. 2 (2026)

With Jimmy Carter

- Last Sundays in Plains: A Centennial Celebration (Virgin, 2024)

With Dalai Lama

- Meditations: The Reflections of His Holiness the Dalai Lama (Glassnote, 2025)

With Lil Jon

- Total Mediation (BMG, 2024)
- Manifest Abundance (BMG, 2024)
- Remix Meditation (Virgin Music, 2025)
- Whispering Nature (Virgin Music, 2026)

With Deepak Chopra & Paul Avgerinos

- Home: Where Everyone Is Welcome (Resilience Music Alliance, 2017)
- Musical Meditations on the Seven Spiritual Laws of Success (RoundSky Music, 2019)
- Spiritual Warrior: Musical Meditations on Self-Liberation (RoundSky Music, 2020)
- Spiritual Warrior Workout (2021)
- Welcome Home: Poems Inspired by Immigrants (2023)
- One Hour to Deep Sleep (2025)
- Power Nap: Musical Meditations for Rest, Relaxation, Rejuvenation (2025)
- Beautiful Sleep: Mellow Music for Rest, Relaxation, Rejuvenation (2026)
- Subliminal Sleep: Warm Words for Relaxing Rest (2026)

=== As sideman ===
With John Daversa Big Band featuring DACA Artists

- American Dreamers: Voices of Hope, Music of Freedom (BFM, 2018)

With Arturo O'Farrill & the Afro Latin Jazz Orchestra

- Familia: Tribute to Bebo and Chico (2017)
- Fandango at the Wall (Resilience Music Alliance, 2018)
- Fandango at the Wall in New York (Tiger Turn, 2022)

With Lori Henriques Quartet featuring Joey Alexander

- Legion of Peace (Motema Music, 2018)

With Swiss Youth Jazz Orchestra

- Transatlantic Rhapsody: Live at Jazzaar Festival 2018 (Shanti Music, 2018)

With Gil Goldstein, Fritz K. Renold, Mehmet Ali Sanlikol

- Abraham: Music for Three Faiths (Shanti Music, 2019)

With Paul Avgerinos

- Devotion (RoundSky Music, 2019)
- Jaya Ram (RoundSky Music, 2019)

With Regina Carter featuring Jon Batiste, John Daversa, Harvey Mason

- Swing States (Eone, 2020)

With Harry Belafonte

- Harry Belafonte reads Frederick Douglass (2019)

With Amaan Ali Bangash and Ayaan Ali Bangash

- Diwali Project: Music and Magic (2024)

With Surishtha Sehgal

- Weaver’s Wisdom: Mediations on Kabir’s Dohe (2025)
- City of Light: A Sleepy Journey to Varanasi (2024)
- Himalayan Nights: A Sleepy Journey to Gulmarg (2023)

With Raghbir Sehgal

- Make It Happen: Affirmations to Help You Get There (2024)

=== As producer ===
With Arturo O'Farrill

- 2011: 40 Acres and a Burro (Associate Producer)
- 2014: The Offense of the Drum (Executive Producer, producer, Liner Notes)
- 2015: Cuba: The Conversation Continues (Executive Producer, Producer, Liner Notes)
- 2017: Familia: Tribute to Bebo & Chico (Executive Producer, Producer, Liner Notes, Composer)
- 2018: Fandango at the Wall (Executive Producer, producer, Liner Notes, composer, Bass, Leona, Vocals)
- 2020: Four Questions (Executive Producer, producer, Liner Notes)
- 2021: Virtual Birdland (Producer, Liner Notes)
- 2021: …dreaming in lions… (Producer)
- 2022: Fandango at the Wall in New York (Executive Producer, Producer)
- 2023: Legacies (Producer)
- 2025: Mundoagua – Celebrating Carla Bley (Producer)
- 2025: The Original Influencers: Dizzy, Chano & Chico (Producer)

Singles

- 2020: "New and improved" – Alyssa Raghu (Producer)
- 2021: "SacaLaCamara" – Manu Manzo
- 2022: "PobreDiablo" (Interlude) – Manu Manzo
- 2022: "SacaLaCamara" (Remix) – Manu Manzo

Albums

- 2011: 40 Acres and a Burro – Arturo O'Farrill & the Afro Latin Jazz Orchestra (Associate Producer)
- 2014: The Offense of the Drum – Arturo O'Farrill & the Afro Latin Jazz Orchestra (Executive Producer, Producer, Liner Notes)
- 2015: Cuba: The Conversation Continues – Arturo O'Farrill & the Afro Latin Jazz Orchestra (Executive Producer, Producer, Liner Notes)
- 2015: 10 – Gabriel Alegria Afro-Peruvian Sextet (Producer)
- 2015: Cumbia Universal – Gregorio Uribe (Producer, Associate Producer, Liner Notes)
- 2016: Presidential Suite: Eight Variations on Freedom – Ted Nash (Executive Producer, Producer, Liner Notes)
- 2016: Native Land – Gwen Hughes (Producer)
- 2016: Runaway Train – Joe Mulholland Trio (Executive Producer, Producer)
- 2016: Tributango – Emilio Solla (Executive Producer, Producer)
- 2016: Carlos Barbosa-Lima Plays Mason Williams – Carlos Barbosa-Lima (Producer)
- 2017: Familia: Tribute to Bebo & Chico – Arturo O'Farrill & the Afro Latin Jazz Orchestra (Executive Producer, Producer, Liner Notes, Composer)
- 2017: Home: Where Everyone Is Welcome (Artist, Producer, Liner Notes, Bass, Composer)
- 2017: Jazz Tango – Pablo Ziegler (Producer, Liner Notes)
- 2017: Maple Leaf Rag – Chris Washburne (Producer, Liner Notes)
- 2017: Rediscovered Ellington – Dial & Oatts, Rich DeRosa, The WDR Big Band (Producer, Liner Notes)
- 2018: Mortality Mansions – Herschel Garfein & Donald Hall (Producer)
- 2018: Argentina vs. Uruguay – Gustavo Casenave & Dario Boente (Executive Producer, Producer, Liner Notes)
- 2018: Vigor Tanguero – Pedro Giraudo (Producer, Liner Notes)
- 2018: An Argentinian in New York – Pedro Giraudo (Producer, Liner Notes)
- 2018: China Caribe – Dongfeng Liu (Producer, Liner Notes)
- 2018: American Dreamers – John Daversa Big Band Featuring DACA Artists (Executive Producer, Producer, Liner Notes, Bass, Composer)
- 2018: Legion of Peace – Lori Henriques Quartet featuring Joey Alexander (Executive Producer, Producer, Bass, Liner Notes)
- 2018: The Planets – Manuel Valera Trio (Producer, Liner Notes)
- 2018: Mindfulness – Paul Avgerinos (Producer)
- 2018: Fandango at the Wall – Arturo O'Farrill & the Afro Latin Jazz Orchestra (Executive Producer, Producer, Liner Notes, Composer, Bass, Leona, Vocals)
- 2019: Meditations on the Seven Spiritual Laws of Success – Deepak Chopra, Paul Avgerinos, Kabir Sehgal (Artist, Producer)
- 2019: Hiding Out – Mike Holober & Gotham Jazz Orchestra (Producer, Liner Notes)
- 2019: Little Havana – Senor Groove (Producer, Liner Notes)
- 2019: Marron y Azul – Daniel Binelli, Nick Danielson (Prodiucer, Liner Notes)
- 2019: Radiotango – Pablo Ziegler Chamber Quartet (Producer, Liner Notes)
- 2019: Shoulder to Shoulder – Karrin Allyson Sextet (Executive Producer, Producer, Liner Notes, Engineer, Arranger)
- 2019: Assembly of Shadows – Remy Le Boeuf (Producer)
- 2019: Delicado – Carlos Barbosa-Lima (Executive Producer, Producer, Liner Notes)
- 2019: Finding Friends Far From Home – Oran Etkin (Producer)
- 2019: Jazz Tango Fusion – Julio Botti (Producer, Liner Notes)
- 2019: Abraham – Gil Goldstein, Fritz K. Renold, Mehmet Ali Sanlikol (Producer, Liner Notes, Bass)
- 2019: The Omni-American Book Club – Brian Lynch Big Band (Producer, Liner Notes)
- 2019: Puertos: Music from International Waters – Emilio Solla Tango Orchestra (Executive Producer, Producer, Liner Notes)
- 2019: Upwards – Joe McCarthy & The New York Afro Bop Alliance Big Band (Producer, Liner Notes)
- 2019: Alegria – Samuel Torres (Executive Producer, Producer, Liner Notes)
- 2019: Balance – Gustavo Casenave (Executive Producer, Producer, Liner Notes)
- 2019: Fuelle y Cuerda – Gustavo Casenave (Producer)
- 2020: Spiritual Warrior – Deepak Chopra, Paul Avgerinos, Kabir Sehgal (Executive Producer, Producer, Artist)
- 2020: Swing States – Regina Carter (Executive Producer, Producer, Liner Notes, Bass, Percussion)
- 2020: Raices Jazz Orchestra – Tony Succar, Pablo Gil (Producer, Liner Notes)
- 2020: If the Night Grows Dark – Camille Zamora (Producer)
- 2020: Strings for Peace – Sharon Isbin, Amjad Ali Khan (Producer, Liner Notes)
- 2020: The Brazilian Trio – Duduka Da Fonseca, Helio Alves, Nilson Matta (Producer, Liner Notes)
- 2020: All Without Words – John Daversa
- 2020: Dialogues on Race – Gregg August
- 2021: Sky Blossom: Songs From My Tour of Duty – Alexis Cole
- 2021: Social Distancing – Gabriel Alegria Afro-Peruvian Sextet
- 2021: Transformation – Glenn Close, Ted Nash
- 2021: Luz – Jovino Santos Neto
- 2022: Asta Hairston Songbook – Gustavo Casenave
- 2022: The Movement – Alphabet Rockers
- 2022: Generation Gap Jazz Orchestra – Steven Feifke, Bijon Watson
- 2022: Brasilified – Cliff Korman
- 2022: Black Men Are Precious – Ethelbert Miller
- 2022: Holidaze – John Beasley
- 2022: honey cadence – Aaron Larget-Caplan
- 2022: Music for Hope – Amjad Ali Khan, Wu Man, Amaan Ali Bangash, Ayaan Ali Bangash, Shane Shanahan
- 2023: How Love Beings – Nicole Zuraitis
- 2023: Metamorphosis – Yumi Kurosawa
- 2023: Freadom – Joanie Leeds
- 2023: Samba for Tarsila – Ben Sher
- 2024: Uruguayan Jazz – Gustavo Casenave
- 2024: Bianca Reimagined – Dan Pugach
- 2024: Holi Project: Colors and Celebration - Amaan Ali Bangash, Ayaan Ali Bangash
- 2024: Live in Aspen – Sharon Isbin and Amjad Ali Khan
- 2024: Brasilia Sessions – Livio Almeida
- 2024: Urban Tracks – Cliff Korman
- 2025: Raga & Samba: The Kolkata Sessions – Amjad Ali Khan, Charlie Byrd
- 2025: If God Invented Baseball – Ethelbert Miller
- 2025: Migrations – Cliff Korman
