= Doug Davis (producer) =

American entertainment lawyer and producer

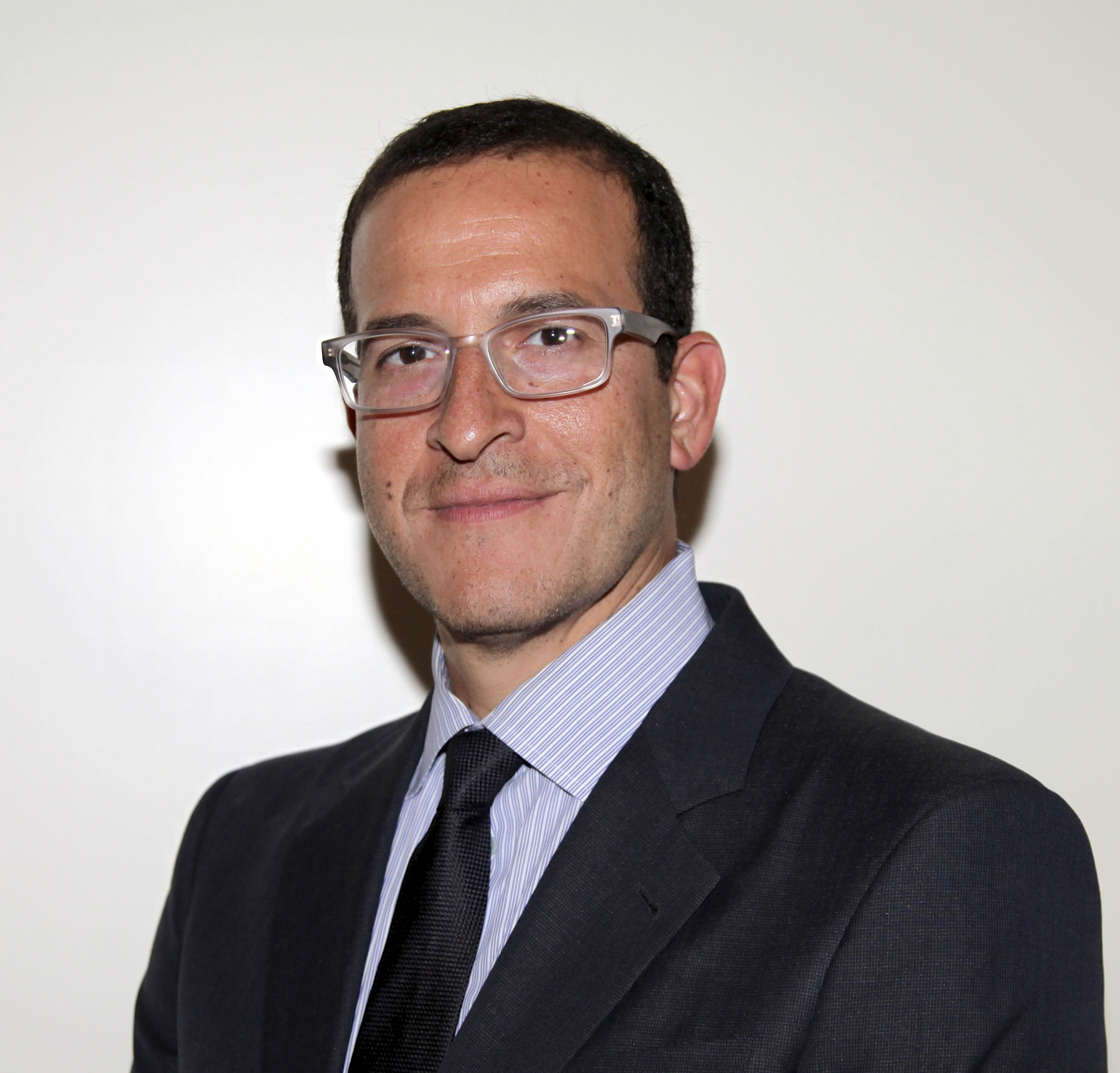
- Born: Douglas J. Davis; March 6, 1972 (age 54); New York City, U.S.
- Education: Syracuse University (BA); Fordham University School of Law (JD)
- Occupations: Entertainment lawyer, producer
- Spouse: Jessie Muscio (m. 2019)
- Children: 2
- Parents: Clive Davis (father); Janet Adelberg Davis (mother)
- Website: davisfirm.net

Douglas J. Davis (born March 6, 1972) is an American entertainment lawyer and producer. He is the founder of The Davis Firm, a New York-based entertainment law practice. Variety named him its Entertainment Lawyer of the Year in 2018, and Billboard has repeatedly included him in its annual Top Music Lawyers lists. As a producer, he has received six Grammy Awards and multiple Emmy Awards.

== Early life and education ==
Davis was born in New York City, the son of music executive Clive Davis and Janet Adelberg Davis. He attended The Town School and the Dwight School in New York. He graduated from the Maxwell School of Citizenship and Public Affairs at Syracuse University with a degree in political science, and received a Juris Doctor from Fordham University School of Law.

== Career ==
=== Law ===
Davis is the founder and managing partner of The Davis Firm, a New York-based entertainment, music and sports law firm. His practice has focused on transactional and strategic work for recording artists, songwriters, producers, executives and entertainment companies. His clients include artists and executives such as LL Cool J, Barry Manilow, Dionne Warwick, DJ Snake, Lil Jon, Swizz Beatz, Mike WiLL Made-It, Savan Kotecha, Larry Jackson and Pitbull.

Billboard has repeatedly named Davis to its annual Top Music Lawyers lists. In 2018, Variety named Davis its Entertainment Lawyer of the Year at the magazine's annual Power of Law event. Variety has also included him in its Power of Law and Legal Impact Report features in subsequent years.

Davis was formerly a licensed NBA player agent and negotiated Metta World Peace's agreement with the New York Knicks. In 2014 and 2015, he was reported to be a leading contender to purchase the Atlanta Hawks, with an ownership group that included music and entertainment executives, artists and celebrities.

=== Music production ===
Davis has been credited as a producer on several Grammy-winning recordings. He was a producer of American Dreamers: Voices of Hope, Music of Freedom, a 2018 jazz project created with Kabir Sehgal and John Daversa featuring DACA recipients, which won three Grammy Awards including Best Large Jazz Ensemble Album. He later produced the Brian Lynch Big Band's The Omni-American Book Club, which won the Grammy Award for Best Large Jazz Ensemble Album at the 62nd Grammy Awards. Davis also produced Arturo O'Farrill and the Afro Latin Jazz Orchestra's Four Questions and Fandango at the Wall in New York, both of which won the Grammy Award for Best Latin Jazz Album.

Davis co-produced Last Sundays in Plains: A Centennial Celebration, a recording honoring President Jimmy Carter, which won the Best Audio Book, Narration and Storytelling Recording at the 67th Grammy Awards. He also co-produced Meditations: The Reflections of His Holiness the Dalai Lama with Kabir Sehgal, an album featuring Rufus Wainwright, Maggie Rogers and Andra Day, which won the Best Audio Book, Narration and Storytelling Recording at the 68th Grammy Awards — the Dalai Lama's first Grammy win.

Davis has also produced original music for Disney, Netflix, WWE, Nickelodeon and Paramount Pictures.

=== Television and live events ===
Davis has served as co-executive producer of the annual Clive Davis Pre-Grammy Gala for approximately 18 years, one of the entertainment industry’s most prominent and glamorous annual gatherings. For the 2025 edition, marking the Gala's 50th anniversary, Davis helped redirect the event into a fundraiser for Los Angeles wildfire relief through MusiCares.

Davis served as executive producer of Aretha! A Grammy Celebration for the Queen of Soul, the all-star Aretha Franklin memorial concert and CBS television special. Davis also served as a producer of Mayfield: Town of Heroes, a television documentary special narrated by Trace Adkins chronicling the resilience of Mayfield, Kentucky following the 2021 tornado.

In 2015, Davis and Roger Gastman co-curated Work in Progress, an art gallery and marketplace event in Los Angeles.

In 2021, Davis served as show producer of New York City's We Love NYC: The Homecoming Concert on the Great Lawn of Central Park, a large-scale post-pandemic comeback concert attended by an estimated 60,000 people and broadcast live by CNN to 200 countries. The concert featured performances by Andrea Bocelli, Jennifer Hudson, LL Cool J, Carlos Santana, Journey, Earth, Wind & Fire and Barry Manilow, among others. When severe weather forced an early end to the concert on the Great Lawn during Barry Manilow's set, Manilow later serenaded Anderson Cooper from his dressing room with "I Made It Through the Rain" during CNN's live coverage, and The Killers performed a brief backstage acoustic version of "Mr. Brightside" from another dressing room.

Also in 2021, Davis served as a segment producer on Celebrating America: An Inauguration Night Special, the primetime television special marking the inauguration of President Joe Biden. That same year, Davis served as an executive producer of Clive Davis: Most Iconic Performances, a television mini-series for Paramount+.

== Philanthropy and board service ==
Davis has been involved in philanthropic work and nonprofit leadership connected to music, health, and social-impact causes. Billboard featured him in its philanthropy issue in 2016, noting the role of personal experience in shaping his charitable commitments.

He has served on the board of directors of UJA-Federation of New York, the board of advisors of the Clive Davis Institute of Recorded Music at New York University, and the board of Fuck Cancer. He has also been identified as an advisory board member of Creative Community for Peace.

He has supported fundraising and benefit efforts for organizations including the Multiple Myeloma Research Foundation, the Drug Policy Alliance, City of Hope, and the United States Holocaust Memorial Museum. Davis also chairs Songs for Hope, a benefit concert series that has raised funds for cancer research benefiting City of Hope over more than fifteen years.

== Recognition and awards ==
In 2018, Variety named Davis its Entertainment Lawyer of the Year at the magazine's annual Power of Law event. Billboard has repeatedly named Davis to its annual Top Music Lawyers lists, including in 2016, 2021, 2024 and 2025.

Doug Davis has won a total of six Grammy Awards.

Davis, alongside collaborators Kabir Sehgal and Russ Hewitt, received Southeast Regional Emmy Awards for Outstanding Musical Composition/Arrangement for Nueva Bossa Nova (2024) and Bossa Nova Strings (2025), both produced under his Tiger Turn media company.

== Personal life ==
Davis lives in New York City with his wife, Jessie Davis, and their two daughters. They both went to the Dwight School for high school but are 14 years apart. They met at a multi year high school reunion in 2010. They dated for 9 years and had their children before marrying in 2019. In 2007, during an emergency appendectomy, he was found to have a carcinoid tumor, requiring eight months of radiohormonal therapy and two surgeries. Davis has described the experience as a turning point that redirected his priorities toward philanthropy and social justice work.
