= Grant Maloy Smith =

American singer-songwriter

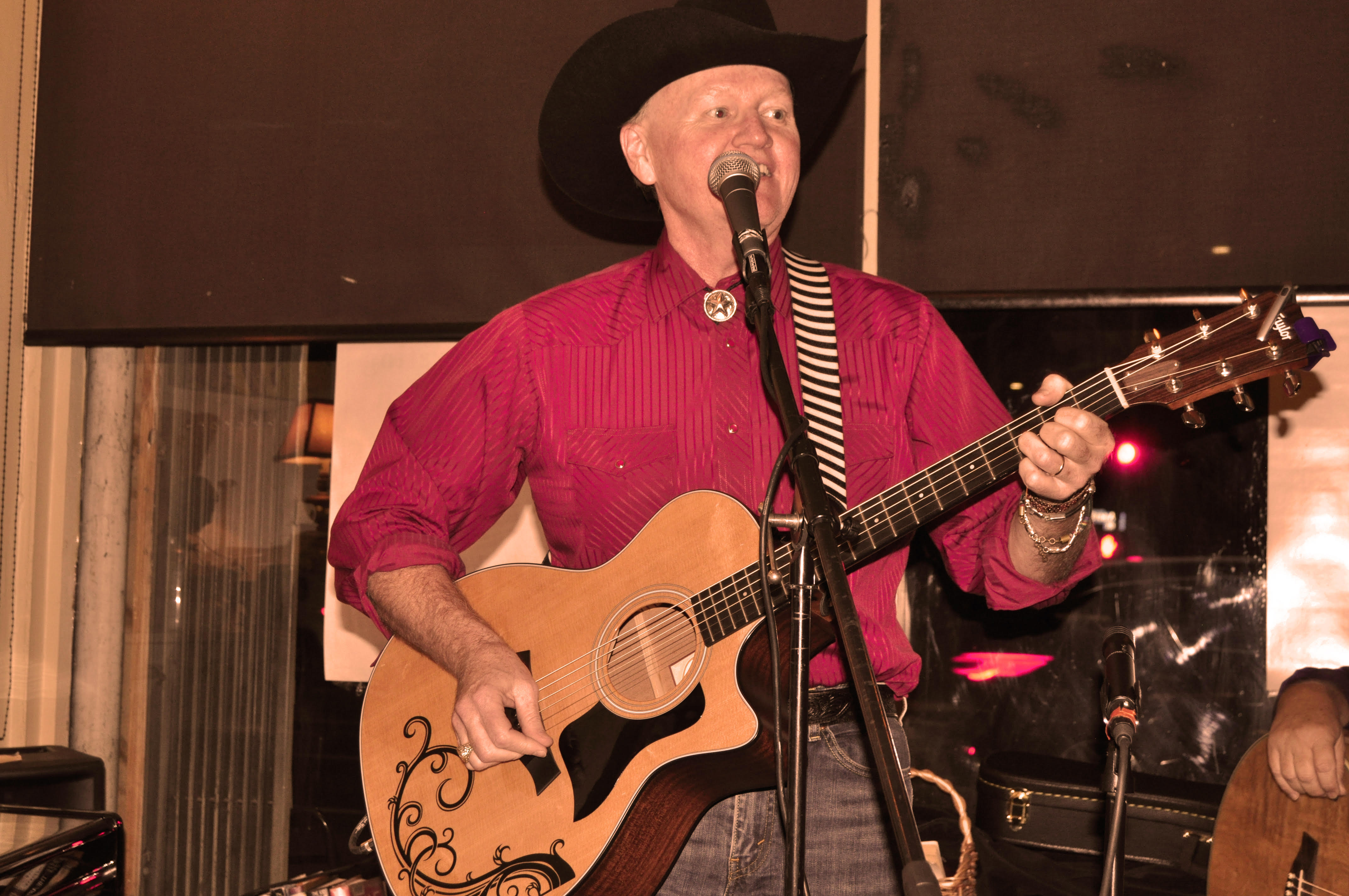

Background information
- Born: August 28, 1957 (age 69); Jacksonville
- Genre: American Roots music
- Occupations: singer, songwriter, musician
- Years active: 1981–present
- Labels: Small Dog Records; Chinese Sock Puppet Records; Suburban Cowboy Records
- Website: grant-maloy-smith.com

Grant Maloy Smith (born August 28, 1957) is an American singer, songwriter, musician, and former businessman from Jacksonville, Florida. In 2017, his album Dust Bowl: American Stories peaked at No. 2 on Billboard's Heatseeker's chart as well as Smith charting at No. 40 on their Emerging Artists' chart. In 2022, he won a Hollywood Music in Media Award for Best Americana Song for Down To Hatchabee Road. In 2026, his single Tennessee Sunshine was nominated for a Grammy Award for Best American Roots Song taking place at the 69th Annual Grammy Awards in 2027.

== Early life ==
Smith was born in Jacksonville, Florida and started playing songs by The Beatles on the guitar at an early age. He attended the Rhode Island School of Design but did not complete his tenure there, opting to focus on music.

Smith taught himself to play the guitar and piano, and started writing songs after high school. His first band was called Britannia (1981-1984). In 2008, he and his band opened for Elvin Bishop, Steppenwolf, and The Guess Who. Britannia played all original music, written by Smith; one Smith's songs "I'm A Loaded Gun" was included on the 1981 album "Southern New England's Best Rock From JB 105".

== Personal life ==
Smith was married in 1985. The family moved to California in 1991.

== Early career ==
Smith worked in the scientific measuring equipment industry in various positions. He eventually started his own company, Dewetron America, Inc, which he sold to Dewetron GMBH of Austria, leaving completely in 2017. Smith and his company provided numerous systems to NASA for the Constellation program. The company won the NASA Tech Briefs Product of the Year Award four times under his leadership, in 2006, 2009, 2012 and 2015. In 2016 he was requested by Medical Design Briefs to write an article outlining his perspective on the future of measuring instruments.

== Music career ==
From 2008 to 2012, Smith wrote and self-produced with his own label, Small Dog Records, several albums of pop/rock music. The first was Already August, (2008), which blended elements of folk and Americana music with pop and rock ballads.

In 2010 Smith released Big Bowl of Courage, with songs that were generally more rock and roll than the previous album. The next album was American Merman (2011), where Smith experimented with reggae structures in several tracks. His final pop/rock album came in 2012, Mister Sparklepants.

In 2012, Smith transitioned to Americana, or American roots music, a subgenre of country music. He wrote and produced the album "Yellow Trailer" originally released on Smith's own Chinese Sock Puppet Records in 2013, but was remastered and re-released in 2015 on Suburban Cowboy Records.

In 2014 Smith was asked by producer Art Greenhaw to sing on several tracks of a Roots Gospel album. He contributed with lead vocals and with one original song of his own "Where Main Street Ends," a gospel version of a song that he had written. This album was entered into the roots gospel category of the Grammys in 2014.

At the end of 2014, Smith was invited by New York producer Perry Margouleff to travel to England and assist him in several shows that singer Paul Rodgers (Bad Company, Free) was doing at the Royal Albert Hall. Smith worked behind the scenes on the tour.

In 2015, Smith narrated a song on a spoken word album produced by Hawaiian-based DJ Cindy Paulos, called Arise Above Abuse: Artists Speak Out for Women. He co-narrated the track "One in Five" with Hawaiian Congresswoman Tulsi Gabbard. He also provided the music for this track and contributed an original song about the kidnapping of women and girls in Africa called "She Would Not Bow Her Head." (from Smith's 2012 Album "Mister Sparklepants").

His next album, "Dust Bowl - American Stories," was released on Suburban Cowboy Records in 2017. Production then moved to Nashville, where additional tracks were recorded by dobro player Rob Ickes, fiddle player Steve Stokes of Alabama, cellist Tim Lorsch of Keith Urban, Percy Sledge, accordion player Jeff Taylor of The Time Jumpers, percussionist and drummer Matt Burgess of Willie Nelson, Lynyrd Skynyrd, Jewel, pedal steel player Mike Johnson, of Alison Krauss and Dolly Parton, violinist Lorenza Ponce of Bon Jovi, Adele, Sam Smith, and violinist Rocio Marron of The Voice, under the supervision of co-producer Jeff Silverman. Because "Dust Bowl - American Stories" is a theme album related to the Dust Bowl of the 1930s, Smith was invited to perform the album at the Kern County Museum on January 14, 2018. He also performed the album for the Bakersfield High School on January 17, 2018, and at the Centennial Rodeo Opry in Oklahoma City in August 2017.

Smith toured the United States, Europe and Mexico. Although primarily a headliner, he sometimes opened for other artists during 2015-2016, including Rita Coolidge, Jon Pousette-Dart, and John Ford Coley. He has performed at The Bitter End in New York, The Clive Davis Theatre at The Grammy Museum, the Troubadour in Hollywood, The National Sylvan Theatre in DC, and The Bluebird Cafe in Nashville. In April 2018, Smith performed on Song Of The Mountains, which is recorded before a live audience and also syndicated on PBS television throughout North America. In August, he performed on Woodsongs Old Time Radio Hour, which is carried by more than 500 radio stations and also broadcast on PBS television.

In 2017, Smith won two Grammy participation certificates for his work as co-producer on the album "Presidential Suite: Eight Variations on Freedom," by jazz artist Ted Nash. In 2018, his original song "Man Of Steel" was named the official theme song of the National Veterans Foundation.

In the same year, Smith appeared as one of the performers at The Indie Collaborative's debut public performance at Carnegie Hall. The Indie Collaborative, a community of independent musicians and industry professionals, was co-founded by Smith and Eileen Bluestone Sherman.

In 2019, Smith's single, I Reckon, recorded by Jeff Clayborn, debuted at #80 on MusicRow's Country Breakout chart. In 2022, Smith performed a cover of Michael Stephenson’s "My Prison" to raise funds. All funds were donated to the National Veteran's Foundation. Later in 2022, Smith again performed at Carnegie Hall for the "Celebrating Earth Day in Song" presented by The Indie Collaborative. The event featured award-winning Emmy, Grammy, and Billboard top 10 musical artists.

== Filmography ==
Smith has scored indie films Code Of Ethics starring Melissa Leo and Pray for Power, starring Lisa Boyle. In 2019, Smith appeared in the feature film Oildale, playing the character Brady Cooper, a musician. In the film he performed one of his original songs "I Come From America", which was sung by Smith's character in the film.

- 1997 - Night of the Beast - composer
- 1998 - Boxed Man - composer, music supervisor
- 1998 - Code of Ethics - composer, music supervisor
- 2001 - Serial Intentions - composer
- 2001 - Pray for Power - composer
- 2002 - Hope High - composer
- 2003 - Extra Credit - actor - Jake Lawrence
- 2008 - Solitaire - composer
- 2008 - PC Noir - composer, sound mixer
- 2009 - Children of Providence - sound mixer
- 2009 - Mythbusters - actor (TV - Season 7, ep. 1) as himself
- 2010 - The Rich and the Poor Are Naked - composer, sound editor
- 2010 - Thinking Through the Drink - composer
- 2010 - Duet - composer
- 2011 - Pledging Allegiance - composer, sound mixer
- 2012 - Nijinsky's Room - composer
- 2012 - Cat Scratch - actor
- 2019 - Oildale - actor - Brady Cooper
- 2020 - Fatal Ambition - composer

== Writing ==
In September 2018, Smith released a Christmas single and children's book that he wrote, called "Fly Possum Fly." He enlisted EmiSunshine to be the featured vocalist on the song.

In 2019, Smith released his second children's book, The Possumbilities are Endless!.

== Awards ==
Year	Nominated work	Category	Award	Result
2027	Tennessee Sunshine	Best American Roots Song	Grammy Award	Nominated
2026	Ro-dee-o	Best Songwriter/Lyrics (Americana)	Global Music Award	Won
2026	Love is Where I've Always Been	Best Americana Song	Indie Music Channel Award	Won
2026	Go West, Boys	Best Americana Artist	Indie Music Channel Award	Won
2026	If Wishes Were Horses	Best Country Artist	Indie Music Channel Award	Won
2026		Best Mississippi Blues	Mississippi Music Award	Won
2026	Mississippi: American Stories	Best Album and Best Concept	Global Music Award	Won
2025	Memphis (featuring Janis Ian)	Best American/Roots	Hollywood Independent Music Award	Nominated
2025	All I Gotta Do	Best Blues	Hollywood Independent Music Award	Nominated
2024	O Holy Night	Best Christmas Americana Song (Male)	Holiday Music & Film Award	Won
2023		Holiday	Hollywood Independent Music Award	Nominated
2022	Cahokia Wind	Best Music Video (Independent)	Hollywood Music in Media Award	Won
2021	Down To Hatchabee Road	Best Americana	Hollywood Music in Media Award	Won
2017		Best Male Americana Artist	Indie Music Channel Awards	Won
2017		Best Vocalist of the Month	Singer Universe	Won
2017		Best Americana/Folk/Acoustic	Hollywood Music in Media Award	Nominated
2016	Old Black Roller	Best Folk Artist/Best Americana Roots Song	Indie Music Channel Awards	Won

== Discography ==
=== Albums ===
Title	Album details	Peak chart positions			Sales
Title	Album details	US Heat	US Folk	US Indie	Sales
American Merman	Released: January 28, 2001 September 20, 2011; Label: Small Dog	—	—	—	
Already August	Released: January 28, 2008; Label: Small Dog	—	—	—	
Big Bowl of Courage	Released: December 1, 2009; Label: Small Dog	—	—	—	
Yellow Trailer	Released: August 16, 2013; Label: Chinese Sock Puppet; Format: CD, digital download	—	—	—	
Dust Bowl: American Stories	Released: June 1, 2017; Label: Suburban Cowboy Records; Format: CD, LP, digital download, streaming	2	22	10	US: 27,700
Appalachia: American Stories	Released: June 25, 2021; Format: CD, LP, digital download, streaming				
The Christmas Heart	Released: November 4, 2022; Suburban Cowboy Records; Format: CD, digital download, streaming				
Mississippi: American Stories	Released: August 23, 2024; Suburban Cowboy Records; Format: CD, LP, digital download, streaming				
Wild West: American Stories	Released: September 18, 2026; Suburban Cowboy Records; Format: CD, LP, digital download				
"—" denotes releases that did not chart
