= Eileen Bluestone Sherman =

American writer

Eileen Bluestone Sherman is an American writer. Throughout the course of her career, she has been a playwright, lyricist, young adult novelist, television writer, theater and music producer, and professor of dramatic literature. Bluestone Sherman is best known for the children's book The Odd Potato, the young adult novel Monday in Odessa, and the musical Perfect Picture. Bluestone Sherman is also the co-founder and co-producer of the Indie Collaborative, a group of independent musicians across genres who perform together, share their work, and explore new collaborations.

== Biography ==
=== Musical theatre ===
Bluestone Sherman and her sister, Gail C. Bluestone, make up the musical theater songwriting duo known as “The Bluestone Sisters", for whom Eileen is the lyricist and Gail composes. Their creative partnership began in 1982 when they wrote a musical for Hallmark's Coterie Theatre in Kansas City, Missouri. Tony and Emmy winner Lillias White has been called the Bluestone Sisters' "muse," performing their single "One More Day," appearing on their albums Perfect Picture and The Odd Potato, and featuring their song "A Little Imagination" in her first solo studio album, Get Yourself Some Happy, released in 2021.

The Bluestone Sisters' musical, The Happiest Day in Heaven, played at the Shofar Festival at the Jewish Museum on Sunday, September 13, 1998.

The Sisters' jazz single, "We Talk Without Words," was recorded by Christian and Melissa Hoff and released in 2022.

==== Perfect Picture ====
The Bluestone Sisters musical Perfect Picture is based on the life of Norman Rockwell and debuted (under the title Rockwell) at the Southern Vermont Art Center in Manchester, VT in 1992. The musical returned to the same venue in 2018 featuring the talents of performers Lillias White, Scarlett Strallen, Sara Esty, Danny Gardner, and Jeremy Benton. It was directed and choreographed by Randy Skinner, musically directed by Timothy Graphenreed, and produced by Joshua Sherman. The performance, in conjunction with Manchester and "Arlington's 4 Freedoms Festival," was listed on The New York Times list of 15 summer theater festivals to see in 2018.

A studio album titled Perfect Picture…But Was All This Real? was produced by Bluestone Sherman's family production company, 6-10 PRODUCTIONS, in 2013, featuring the talents of Broadway stars Debbie Gravitte, Ron Holgate, Judy Kaye, Mark Jacoby, Beth Leavel, Andrea McArdle, Emily Skinner, Randy Skinner, Bob Stillman, Tom Wopat, Lillias White, and Karen Ziemba.

==== The Odd Potato ====
Bluestone Sherman wrote a children's book called The Odd Potato in 1984 based on a story from her family's history. A concert musical based on the tale was developed by the Bluestone Sisters and performed at Symphony Space in 2003, directed and choreographed by Randy Skinner. A subsequent studio album (The Odd Potato: The Broadway Album) was produced two years later in 2005 and featured performances by 20 Tony Award winners including Jim Dale, Dan Fogler, Sutton Foster, Boyd Gaines, Debbie Gravitte, Judd Hirsch, Ron Holgate, Cady Huffman, Judy Kaye, Dick Latessa, Hal Linden, Priscilla Lopez, John Mahoney, Donna McKechnie, Michele Pawk, Maryann Plunkett, Hal Prince, Elaine Stritch, Lillias White and Scott Wise.

Bluestone Sherman won a Chicago/Midwest Emmy for The Odd Potato television special.

=== Writing ===
Monday in Odessa, a novel about a young Russian Jewish girl living in the Soviet Union, was published by the Jewish Publication Society in 1986. The book won the National Jewish Book Award for Children's Literature in 1987 and is featured in the University of Nebraska Kearney library's Notable Social Studies Trade Books for Young People list.

Bluestone Sherman's book, Independence Avenue, celebrates Kansas City history and was honored by the Kansas City Public Library Board of Trustees by featuring the title in their "Community Bookshelf," a unique facade for downtown city parking.

In the summer of 2020, Bluestone Sherman released the audiobook for her young adult novel, The Violin Players. The book is set in the 1990s and tells the story of a non-observant Jewish teen who learns to stand up against antisemitic bullies at her new high school.

=== Teaching ===
Bluestone Sherman became a theater professor at Baker University's School of Professional and Graduate Studies in 1997 and remains an adjunct instructor today. In 2012, the University awarded her with the title of Outstanding Professor of the Year of the Graduate Division.

=== The Indie Collaborative ===
In 2015, Bluestone Sherman co-founded the Indie Collaborative alongside Americana Roots musician Grant Maloy Smith. The Indie Collaborative offers free membership to independent musicians and industry professionals and provides a community to work together and support one another. Bluestone Sherman has produced private showcases and public concerts with the group at venues including the Drama League, Carnegie Hall, and Lincoln Center. Notable members include lyricist Mike Greenly, English blues guitarist Trevor Sewell, Stomp veteran Keith "Wildchild" Middleton, and Grammy Award winners Wouter Kellerman, Ricky Kej, Herschel Garfein, and Kabir Sehgal.

== Honors and awards ==
Bluestone Sherman's young adult novel Monday in Odessa won the 1987 National Jewish Book Award for Children’s Literature.

In 1990, Bluestone Sherman was one of five winning entrants of the Children Programming Single Program category at the Chicago/Midwest Emmy Awards for producing The Odd Potato.

== Personal life ==
Bluestone Sherman married her husband, who works in medicine, five days after graduating from college. She reports being the "primary breadwinner" for the first three years of her marriage and credits this time as the start of her lifelong love of working in many different fields.

Bluestone Sherman has two children, a son and a daughter. Her daughter Jenny's experiences with antisemitism during her high school years was the inspiration for Bluestone Sherman's The Violin Players.

Bluestone Sherman formed her family's production company, 6-10 PRODUCTIONS with her two children in 2003.
