= Ghazi Faisal Al-Mulaifi =

Kuwaiti musician and ethnomusicologist

Ghazi Faisal Al-Mulaifi (born 1977) is a Kuwaiti musician, ethnomusicologist, and ensemble leader working in jazz and world music.

== Biography ==
Al-Mulaifi is the son of a former Kuwaiti ambassador to Germany. During the Iraq War, his grandfather stayed with his family in Bonn. At that point Al-Mulaifi learned that his grandfather had been a shipmaster and pearl diver in Kuwait. This sparked his interest in Kuwaiti pearl diving music, which became the subject of his thesis at New York University.

He received a PhD in ethnomusicology from New York University in 2016.

== Career ==
Al-Mulaifi is an Assistant Professor of Music at NYU Abu Dhabi.

He is the founder of Boom.Diwan, a jazz and world music ensemble. Boom is the variety of ship that was used for pearl diving in Kuwait. Diwan refers to "the traditional gathering places where Kuwaiti maritime music ensembles preserve and pass down their musical heritage." Boom.Diwan formed with musicians interested in the related musical history.

Al-Mulaifi has collaborated extensively with Arturo O'Farrill. O'Farrill learned of Al-Mulaifi via an invitation to work with the NYU Abu Dhabi Arts Center. Al-Mulaifi contributed a song to O'Farrill's 2021 Virtual Birdland. Al-Mulaifi subsequently became one of the first musicians from the Arab states of the Persian Gulf to be nominated for a Grammy Award for Best Latin Jazz Album. Following a series of performances in which Boom.Diwan played with O’Farrill’s Afro Latin Jazz Orchestra, the two recorded Live in the Khaleej! in 2024.

He has also collaborated with Nduduzo Makhathini.

Al-Mulaifi is a scholar of the musical tradition associated with the Kuwaiti pearl diving trade. In 2025 he began work on a book about the subject.

He cites John Coltrane and Jimi Hendrix as influences.

== Discography ==
- MINARETS, Boom.Diwan featuring Nduduzo Makhathini, 2021
- Virtual Birdland, Arturo O'Farrill And The Afro Latin Jazz Orchestra featuring Boom.Diwan, 2021
- Live in the Khaleej!, Ghazi Faisal Al-Mulaifi, Boom.Diwan, and Arturo O’Farrill, 2024
