= Four Questions (album) =

Studio album by Arturo O'Farrill and the Afro Latin Jazz Orchestra
- Released: April 10, 2020
- Genre: Jazz
- Length: 62:10
- Label: Zoho Music

Arturo O'Farrill chronology
Fandango at the Wall (2018)	Four Questions (2020)

Four Questions is a 2020 album by Arturo O'Farrill and the Afro Latin Jazz Orchestra and produced by Kabir Sehgal and Doug Davis. It won the 2021 Grammy Award for Best Latin Jazz Album.

== Track listing ==
Four Questions track listing
No.	Title	Length
1.	"Baby Jack"	7:22
2.	"Jazz Twins"	9:31
3.	"Four Questions" (featuring Dr. Cornel West)	16:13
4.	"Clump, Unclump"	7:18
5.	"A Still, Small Voice I: Elijah (1 Kings 19:13)" (featuring the "Still, Small Voice" Singers)	8:05
6.	"A Still, Small Voice II: Amidst the Fire and Whirlwind" (featuring the "Still, Small Voice" Singers)	1:14
7.	"A Still, Small Voice III: Cacophonus"	4:25
8.	"A Still, Small Voice IV: A Still, Small Voice" (featuring the "Still, Small Voice" Singers)	8:02
Total length:		62:10
