= Song for Chico =

Studio album by Arturo O'Farrill
- Released: April 8, 2008
- Recorded: April 23, 2006
- Label: Zoho Music

Professional ratings
Review scores
Source	Rating
Allmusic	4/5 stars

Song for Chico is an album by Arturo O'Farrill and the Afro-Latin Jazz Orchestra, released through Zoho Music in 2008. In 2009, the album won O'Farrill and the group the Grammy Award for Best Latin Jazz Album.

== Track listing ==
1. "Caravan" (Tizol) – 7:17
2. "Such Love" (O'Farrill) – 8:15
3. "Picadillo" (Puente) – 4:55
4. "Song for Chico" (Prieto) – 8:23
5. "Starry Nights" (Seeley) – 7:11
6. "Cuban Blues" (O'Farrill) – 2:51
7. "Humility" (Harrell) – 5:50
8. "The Journey" (O'Farrill) – 4:58
