= Kaleidoscope Eyes: Music of the Beatles =

Studio album by John Daversa
- Released: 2016
- Genre: Jazz
- Label: BFM Jazz

John Daversa chronology
Artful Joy (2012)	Kaleidoscope Eyes: Music of the Beatles (2016)

Kaleidoscope Eyes: Music of the Beatles is an album by John Daversa, released on May 6, 2016. It earned Daversa a Grammy Award nomination for Best Large Jazz Ensemble Album.

== Track listing ==
1. "Good Day Sunshine" (with Renee Olstead) (Lennon–McCartney) - 5:14
2. "And I Love Her" (Lennon–McCartney) - 4:40
3. "Lucy in the Sky with Diamonds" (Lennon–McCartney) - 7:00
4. "Here Comes the Sun" (George Harrison) - 9:34
5. "Do You Want to Know a Secret" (with Renee Olstead) (Lennon–McCartney) - 4:45
6. "I Saw Her Standing There" (with Katisse) (Lennon–McCartney) - 10:35
7. "Michelle" (Lennon–McCartney) - 9:40
8. "Kaleidoscope Eyes Medley: With a Little Help from My Friends/Ob-La-Di Ob-La-Da/Sgt. Pepper's Lonely Hearts Club Band/I Am the Walrus" (Lennon–McCartney) - 6:46
9. "Good Day Sunshine (Reprise)" - 2:08

Track listing adapted from AllMusic.
