= American Dreamers: Voices of Hope, Music of Freedom =

2018 album by John Daversa Big Band

Studio album by John Daversa Big Band
- Released: 2018
- Genre: Jazz

American Dreamers: Voices of Hope, Music of Freedom is a studio album by the John Daversa Big Band and produced by Kabir Sehgal and Doug Davis, released on September 21, 2018. The album was recorded with more than 50 singers and musicians who entered America as children. Daversa intended the album as a message to politicians to protect immigrants. The album has been described as "invigorating" and "one of, if not the most, important musical statements across several genres this year aimed at bringing unity and healing divisiveness".

== Background ==
On Sept. 5, 2017, the Department of Homeland Security (DHS) initiated the phase out of the immigration program known as Deferred Action for Childhood Arrivals (DACA). Concerned with the emotional trauma and anxiety inflicted upon DACA recipients (Dreamers) as their immigration status hung in the balance, entertainment attorney and philanthropist Davis, "sought to raise support for these aspiring citizens, something that stretches beyond just the scope of 'writing a check'".

Davis reached out to jazz bassist, composer, and producer, Kabir Sehgal, and what started out as a project to help raise awareness about the DACA program, became an idea for an album, led by Daversa. In an interview with Variety, Sehgal, whose parents came to America from India, said "I was born and raised in America, I grew up knowing how important and integral immigrants were to the American experience." Davis added that the album, "will not only show that these DACA kids love America, but that they are talented musicians and singers, deserving of every chance they can get to see their artistic and professional dreams through".

"The choice to make a jazz record was not only an aesthetic one, but symbolic." stated Daversa, who is also chair of the studio music and jazz department at University of Miami's Frost School of Music. Together, the team located 53 Dreamers across 17 states willing to participate in the project.

== Recording and production ==
The artists, ranging in age from 18 to mid-30s, came together in Miami to record on a single soundstage. Not every Dreamer on the album, which includes spoken-word interstitials in which each one shares about their backstory, is a professional-caliber musician, but all of them have something to say to the American people about the nation’s current immigration crisis. American Dreamers was sponsored by the albums' Executive ProducerTroy Carter, with money from Spotify, and relied on donated studio time at University of Miami, NYU and the Clive Davis Institute of Recorded Music.

== Track listing ==
Credits taken from AllMusic.

No.	Title	Writer(s)	Length
1.	"Salvador"	John Daversa/Kabir Sehgal	1:32
2.	"Living in America"	Dan Hartman/Charlie Midnight	5:52
3.	"Saba"	John Daversa/Kabir Sehgal	1:41
4.	"Don't Fence Me In"	Cole Porter	4:43
5.	"Caliph"	Gene Coye/Jerry Watts, Jr./Zach Larmer/Kabir Sehgal	1:35
6.	"Immigrant Song"	Jimmy Page/Robert Plant	3:17
7.	"Daisy"	John Daversa/Kabir Sehgal	1:07
8.	"Deportee (Plane Wreck at Los Gatos)"	Woody Guthrie/Martin Hoffman	4:49
9.	"Denzel"	Kabir Sehgal	1:25
10.	"Stars and Stripes Forever"	John Philip Sousa	4:29
11.	"Alicia"	Murph Aucamp/Kabir Sehgal	1:16
12.	"America" (from West Side Story)	Leonard Bernstein/Stephen Sondheim	1:29
13.	"Juan Carlos"	Kabir Sehgal	1:21
14.	"America the Beautiful"	Katharine Lee Bates/Samuel A. Ward	4:39
15.	"Maria"	John Daversa/Kabir Sehgal	0:54
16.	"All Is One"	John Daversa	8:40
17.	"Edson"		1:33
18.	"Red, White, and Remixed"	John Daversa/Kabir Sehgal	3:27
Total length:			53:49

== Reception ==
Matt Greenblatt with The Aquarian Weekly wrote, "This one almost made me cry. Their spoken-word intros before they perform are heartbreaking. They introduce themselves, their age, their instrument and their circumstances." Greenblatt went further to state that "It's a powerful statement of human understanding and empathy." Pablo Gorodi from the Associated Press wrote, "Daversa's talents are one of the keys making the album such a rewarding musical listen, as his arrangements expertly integrate the 'Dreamers'' talents with the big band and put exciting twists on several well-known tunes and a few originals."

Jazz Music Archives said American Dreamers is a great listen just to hear the young musician's stories, but you also get John Daversa's big band playing wild arrangements that can recall 'out-there' band arrangers such as Don Ellis, Anthony Braxton and Sun Ra. Most of the tracks are covers that have been completely re-arranged into fresh new pieces. George Harris of Jazz Weekly said, "While you may like this album more or less depending on your political spectrum, you can't help but appreciate John Daversa's ambitious musical project... A good soundtrack for an important debate."

The album won three Grammy Awards at the 61st Annual Grammy Awards: Best Large Jazz Ensemble Album, "Don't Fence Me In" won in the Best Improvised Jazz Solo category, and "Stars and Stripes Forever" won in the Best Arrangement, Instrumental or A Cappella category.

== See also ==
- Deferred Action for Childhood Arrivals
