= Presidential Suite: Eight Variations on Freedom =

Studio album by Ted Nash Big Band
- Released: September 9, 2016
- Recorded: September 14, 2014
- Genres: Jazz, big band
- Length: 58:38
- Label: Motéma

Ted Nash Big Band chronology
Chakra (2013)	Presidential Suite: Eight Variations on Freedom (2016)

Presidential Suite: Eight Variations on Freedom is an album by the Ted Nash Big Band that won the Grammy Award for Best Large Jazz Ensemble Album in 2017. "Spoken at Midnight" won Best Instrumental Composition.

Most of the musicians are members of the Jazz at Lincoln Center Orchestra led by Wynton Marsalis. Nash has been a member since the 1990s and wrote the music on a commission for the orchestra.

== Track listing ==
All music is composed by Ted Nash.

No.	Title	Length
1.	"Overture"	1:31
2.	"Joe Lieberman Reads John F. Kennedy"	1:21
3.	"Ask Not – Kennedy"	5:40
4.	"Deepak Chopra Reads Jawaharlal Nehru"	1:43
5.	"Spoken at Midnight – Nehru"	5:39
6.	"William Vanden Heuvel Reads Franklin D. Roosevelt"	1:34
7.	"The Four Freedoms – Roosevelt"	8:23
8.	"Douglas Brinkley Reads Ronald Reagan"	1:20
9.	"Tear Down This Wall – Reagan"	4:05
10.	"David Miliband Reads Winston Churchill"	1:46
11.	"This Deliverance – Churchill"	4:58
12.	"Glenn Close Reads Aung San Suu Kyi"	1:44
13.	"Water in Cupped Hands – Suu Kyi"	4:15
14.	"Sam Waterston Reads Lyndon Johnson"	1:48
15.	"The American Promise – Johnson"	6:11
16.	"Andrew Young Reads Nelson Mandela"	1:35
17.	"The Time for the Healing of the Wounds – Mandela"	5:16

== Personnel ==
Adapted from AllMusic.

Musicians

- Ted Nash – conductor, alto sax, soprano sax, arranger
- Walter Blanding – soprano sax, tenor sax, clarinet
- Charles Pillow – clarinet, flute, alto sax, soprano sax
- Paul Nedzela – bass clarinet, baritone sax
- Victor Goines – bass, clarinet, alto flute, tenor sax
- Sherman Irby – flute, alto flute, alto sax
- Greg Gisbert – trumpet
- Ryan Kisor – trumpet
- Wynton Marsalis – trumpet
- Marcus Printup – trumpet
- Kenny Rampton – trumpet
- Chris Crenshaw – trombone
- Vince Gardner – trombone
- Elliot Mason – trombone
- Carlos Henriquez – double bass, bass guitar
- Dan Nimmer – piano
- Ali Jackson – drums, percussion
- Zach Adelman – percussion
- Ansel Scholl – cowbell

Readers

- Douglas Brinkley, Glenn Close, Deepak Chopra, Joe Lieberman, David Miliband, William vanden Heuvel, Sam Waterston, Andrew Young

Production

- Liner notes – Ted Nash, Douglas Brinkley, Kabir Sehgal
- Kabir Sehgal – executive producer
- Jana Herzen – senior producer
- Producer – Robert Allen, Douglas Brinkley, Michael D. Fricklas, Herschel Garfein, Adam Inselbuch, Scott Jacobson, Alexander Walser
- Assistant producer – Kenya Autie, Oscar Autie, Paul Avgerinos
- Associate producer – Ryan Bethea, Dorie Clark, Laura Dickinson, Jose Garcia, Ben Gundersheimer, Lori Henriques, Ryan Holiday, Saad Khan, David Longoria, Nicolas Rodriguez-Brizuela, Grant Maloy Smith, Dennis Sy, Julian Weller, Camille Zamora
- Rob Macomber – engineer, mixing engineer
- Doug Schwartz – mastering engineer

== See also ==
- The Kennedy Dream, a 1967 album by Oliver Nelson of big band compositions interspersed with speeches by John F. Kennedy
