= Arturo O'Farrill =

Mexican pianist, composer, and bandleader (born 1960)

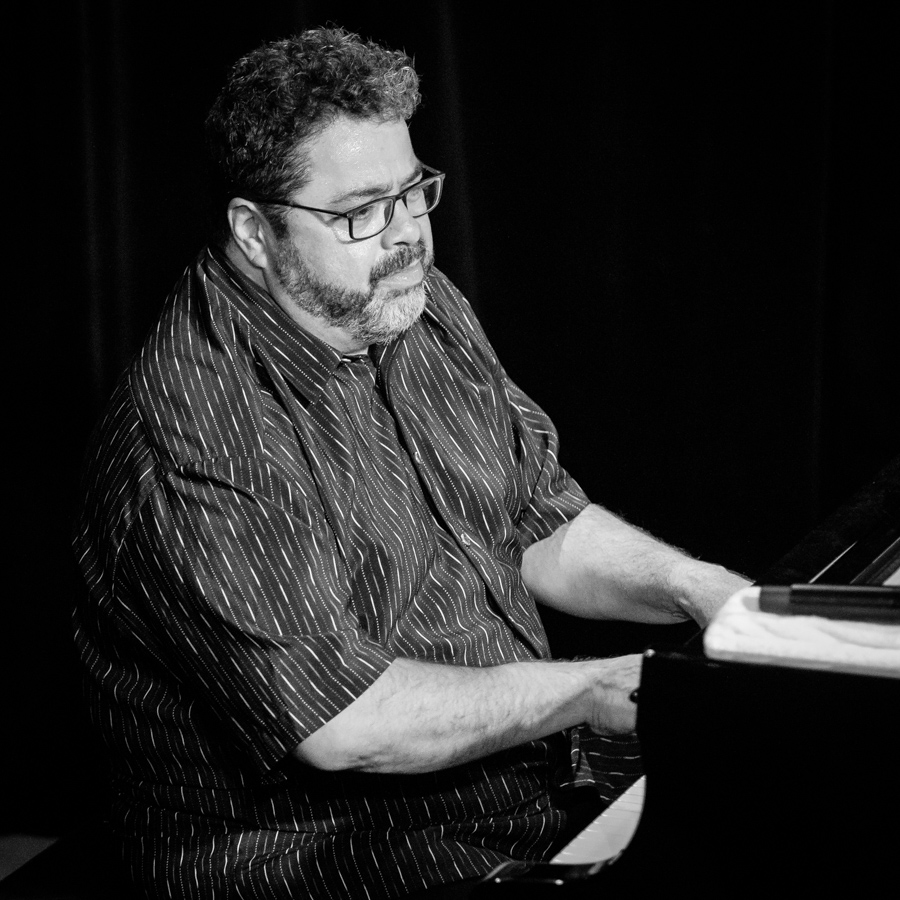
- O'Farrill in 2018

Background information
- Born: Arturo O'Farrill Valero; June 22, 1960 (age 66); Mexico City, Mexico
- Genres: Latin jazz, Afro-Cuban jazz
- Occupations: Musician, composer, bandleader
- Instrument: Piano
- Years active: 1979–present
- Labels: Milestone, 32 Jazz, Zoho Music, Motéma, Blue Note, Resilience Music Alliance
- Formerly of: Jazz at Lincoln Center Orchestra
- Website: arturoofarrill.com

Arturo O'Farrill (born June 22, 1960) is a jazz musician, the son of Latin jazz musician, arranger and bandleader Chico O'Farrill, and pianist, composer, and director for the Afro Latin Jazz Orchestra. He is best known for his contributions to contemporary Latin jazz (more specifically Afro-Cuban jazz), having received Grammy Awards and nominations, though he has trained in other forms such as free jazz and experimented briefly with hip hop.

== Early life and education ==
Arturo O'Farrill was born in Mexico City, Mexico, to Lupe Valero and Chico O'Farrill on June 22, 1960. His mother Lupe was a singer from Mexico, and his father Chico was a jazz trumpeter and composer originally from Havana, Cuba. His father's family was of Irish and German descent. The family lived in Mexico until 1965, when they moved to New York City. Here, his father Chico found work as music director for the CBS program "Festival of Lively Arts", where he formed relationships with jazz musicians Count Basie, Dizzy Gillespie, Gerry Mulligan, and Stan Getz. However Chico also worked with many Latin music artists such as Tito Puente, Machito, Celia Cruz, and La Lupe, which, for son Arturo, led to a "psychotic upbringing" in which he was unsure of his own cultural identity. At the age of six O'Farrill began taking piano lessons at the behest of his parents, initially disliking them very strongly before warming up to the instrument and deciding around the age of 12 that he wanted to be a career musician. Eschewing his father's musical style, O'Farrill instead chose to focus on other forms of jazz, listening to artists such as Bud Powell and Chick Corea.

He received a formal musical education, graduating from LaGuardia High School for Music and Art and then studying at the Manhattan School of Music, the Conservatory of Music at Brooklyn College (from which he received the Distinguished Alumnus Medal), and the Aaron Copland School of Music at Queens College.

== Career ==
=== As a sideman ===
In 1979, O'Farrill was playing in an upstate New York bar when he was noticed by jazz pianist, organist, and composer Carla Bley. Impressed with his talent, Bley recruited the then 19-year-old O'Farrill to play with her band in Carnegie Hall even though she was uncertain whether or not he could read music. He remained with her band for three years afterwards. In addition to his regular role as a pianist, O'Farrill sometimes played organ with the band. After leaving the Carla Bley Big Band, O'Farrill found solo work with artists such as Dizzy Gillespie, Howard Johnson, Steve Turre, and Lester Bowie. In 1987 O'Farrill found long-term employment as Harry Belafonte's music director.

In the early 1990s, O'Farrill slowly began to return to his Latin roots. While struggling to record a "Latin jingle", O'Farrill contacted bassist Andy Gonzalez, who, according to O'Farrill, "took me through the history of Latin piano." After this, Andy and brother Jerry began to feature O'Farrill in their band as a substitute for regular pianist Larry Willis.

=== Chico O'Farrill Afro-Cuban Jazz Orchestra and Afro Latin Jazz Orchestra (ALJO) ===
Not long after his stint with Andy and Jerry Gonzalez's Fort Apache Band, Arturo O'Farrill joined his father Chico O'Farrill to aid in the latter's late-career musical revival. In his frail state Chico was unable to manage his own affairs, and so he began to delegate the hiring of his musicians to outside contractors. Seeing this, Arturo O'Farrill stepped in on his father's behalf and assembled what became known as the Chico O'Farrill Afro-Cuban Jazz Orchestra. In 1995 he was named pianist and music director of the orchestra. In 1997 the Chico O'Farrill Afro-Cuban Jazz Orchestra began to play at Birdland each Sunday night, and when his father died in 2001 Arturo became bandleader.

In 2001, Wynton Marsalis, artistic director of the Jazz at Lincoln Center program and musical director of the Lincoln Center Jazz Orchestra, sought O'Farrill's help for an upcoming themed concert titled "The Spirit of Tito Puente". Despite O'Farrill's best efforts, though, the Lincoln Center Jazz Orchestra was simply not equipped to play Latin jazz:

There was a benefit performance pairing Wynton's orchestra with Tito Puente's, [and] Wynton had me lead a rehearsal of the Latin numbers. I wanted them to play a Cuban phrase, but they just could not articulate it authentically. They would 'jazz' it up. They could not 'Afro-Cubanize' it. Wynton had this faraway look in his eye. I think that's when he realized that it takes a specialized group of musicians. It's a different approach – artistically, mentally and emotionally.

— Arturo O'Farrill, Wall Street Journal

Following this concert, Marsalis offered O'Farrill the opportunity to form and lead an Afro-Cuban jazz band that would perform regularly at Lincoln Center, which O'Farrill accepted. He named the new band the Afro Latin Jazz Orchestra (ALJO), and opted for traditional jazz big band instrumentation with the addition of a three-piece Cuban percussion section. In 2005 Arturo O'Farrill released his first album with the ALJO, Una Noche Inolvidable, for which he received a Grammy nomination in the category "Best Traditional Tropical Latin Album".

In 2007, O'Farrill and the ALJO left Jazz at Lincoln Center "to pursue its own educational and performance opportunities,"' moving their performances to New York's Symphony Space. That same year, he was appointed assistant professor of jazz at the University of Massachusetts Amherst, and he established the non-profit organization the Afro Latin Jazz Alliance, which provides instruments and musical lessons for New York City public school students. In 2008 O'Farrill released his second album with the ALJO, the Grammy-winning Song for Chico, and also took up residency as an assistant professor at State University of New York at Purchase.

In December 2010 O'Farrill travelled to Cuba with his mother, sons, and the Chico O'Farrill Afro Cuban Orchestra, in order to bring his father's music back to the island. There, the band headlined the 26th Havana International Jazz Plaza Festival. In 2011, once he had returned from Cuba, O'Farrill directed the Chico O'Farrill Afro Cuban Jazz Orchestra's final show at Birdland, capping 15 straight years of regular performances. Later that year he released his third Grammy-nominated album with the ALJO titled 40 Acres and a Burro.

In 2014, Arturo O'Farrill and the Chico O'Farrill Afro-Cuban Jazz Orchestra won the Latin Grammy Award for Best Instrumental Album for Final Night at Birdland.

In 2015, O'Farrill and the Afro Latin Jazz Orchestra won a Grammy Award for Best Latin Jazz Album for The Offense of the Drum. On August 21, 2015, Arturo O'Farrill and the Afro Latin Jazz Orchestra released Cuba: The Conversation Continues, which was recorded in Havana 48 hours after President Obama announced his plan to normalize relations between the U.S. and Cuba. The album was nominated for a Grammy Award for Best Large Jazz Ensemble Album in 2016.

O'Farrill won a 2018 Grammy Award for Best Instrumental Composition for "Three Revolutions," a song from the 2017 album Familia: Tribute to Bebo+Chico.

Virtual Birdland, a 2021 album featuring Malika Zarra, Ghazi Faisal Al-Mulaifi, Paquito D’Rivera, and many other musicians, developed and recorded during the COVID-19 pandemic, was nominated for a Grammy Award for Best Latin Jazz Album in 2021. A track from the album, "Dreaming in Lions," was nominated for Best Instrumental Composition.

=== Fandango at the Wall ===
Fandango at the Wall is the title of a 2020 HBO film directed by Varda Bar-Kar, centred on the annual Fandango Fronterizo music festival that takes place on both sides of the Tijuana-San Diego border between Mexico and the United States. Festival founder Jorge Francisco Castillo hosts O'Farrill along with producer Kabir Sehgal on a trip to the Mexican state of Veracruz, where they meet the master musicians of the 300-year-old traditional music style known as "son jarocho", which combines indigenous, Spanish, and African elements. Musicians are recruited to join the festival. The film features son jarocho masters Andrés Vega Delfín, Martha Vega, Ramón Gutiérrez, Wendy Cao Romero, Tacho Utrera, Fernando Guadarrama, and Patricio Hidalgo, and includes special appearances by American jazz violinist Regina Carter; American historian Douglas Brinkley; American actress Mandy Gonzalez; Mexican musical trio the Villalobos Brothers; Iraqi-American oud master Rahim AlHaj; and Sahba Motallebi.

There is also an album of the same name and another titled Fandango at the Wall in New York by O'Farrill, and a book by Kabir Sehgal that examines the relationship between the US and Mexico.

=== Casa Belongó ===
Casa Belongó is the future and first permanent home of O'Farrill's ALJO, now known as Belongó. It is expected to open in 2027.

== Musical style ==
Unlike his father, whose music was undeniably Afro-Cuban in nature, Arturo O'Farrill incorporates sounds from throughout Latin America. Reflective of big band traditions in Haiti, the Dominican Republic, Mexico, and elsewhere, his music is described as stylistically "pan-Latin" by critic Dan Bilawsky. Philip Booth of JazzTimes writes that the Afro Latin Jazz Orchestra's 2011 record 40 Acres and a Burro "has the big-band digging deeper into the textures and rhythms of South America and the Caribbean" than ever before.

== Personal life ==
As of 2014 O'Farrill was living in New York City with his wife Alison Deane, a trained classical pianist, and sons Zachary (a drummer) and Adam O'Farrill (a trumpeter), who formed the O'Farrill Brothers Band.

On August 14, 2015, O'Farrill was among those who were invited to witness the moment the U.S. flag was raised over a reopened U.S. Embassy in Cuba for the first time in 54 years.

== Awards and honors ==
Year	Nominee / work	Award	Result
2006	Una Noche Inolvidable	Best Traditional Tropical Latin Album	Nominated
2009	Song for Chico	Best Latin Jazz Album	Won
2012	40 Acres and a Burro	Best Large Jazz Ensemble Album	Nominated
2014	Final Night at Birdland	Best Instrumental Performance	Won
2015	The Offense of the Drum	Best Latin Jazz Album	Won
2018	Three Revolutions	Best Instrumental Composition	Won
2021	Four Questions	Best Latin Jazz Album	Won
2021	"Baby Jack"	Best Instrumental Composition	Nominated
2023	Fandango At The Wall In New York	Best Latin Jazz Album	Won

== Discography ==
=== As leader ===
- 1999 Blood Lines (Milestone)
- 2000 A Night in Tunisia (32 Jazz)
- 2004 Cumana (Pony Canyon)
- 2005 Live in Brooklyn (Zoho Music)
- 2005 Una Noche Inolvidable (Palmetto)
- 2005 The Jim Seeley/Arturo O'Farrill Quintet (Zoho Music)
- 2008 Song for Chico (Zoho Music)
- 2009 Risa Negra (Zoho Music)
- 2011 40 Acres and a Burro (Zoho Music)
- 2012 The Noguchi Sessions (Zoho Music)
- 2013 Final Night at Birdland (Zoho Music)
- 2014 The Offense of the Drum (Motéma)
- 2015 Cuba: The Conversation Continues (Motéma)
- 2017 Familia (Tribute to Bebo + Chico) with Chuco Valdez (Motéma)
- 2018 Fandango at the Wall (Resilience)
- 2023 Legacies (Blue Note)

=== As sideman ===
With Ray Barretto, Michael Philip Mossman, and Patato Valdez

- 2001 The Orisha Suite (Connector)

With Carla Bley

- 1982 Live! (ECM)
- 1983 Mortelle Randonnee (Mercury)
- 1984 I Hate to Sing (ECM)

With Chico O'Farrill

- 1995 Pure Emotion (Milestone)
- 1999 Heart of a Legend (Milestone)
- 2000 Carambola (Milestone)

With Bebo Valdés

- 2011 Chico & Rita (Calle 54)
