= Paul Avgerinos =

American music composer (born 1957)

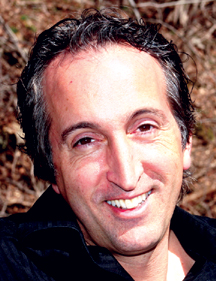

Background information
- Born: November 21, 1957 (age 68); Norwalk, Connecticut, United States
- Genre: New-age
- Occupations: Musician, Composer; Record producer
- Instruments: bass violin, cello, keyboard instruments, Audio engineer
- Website: RoundSky Music

Paul Costas Avgerinos (born November 21, 1957 in Norwalk, Connecticut) is a multi-Grammy-winning music composer, performer, producer and engineer who works in the genres of ambient, space, world, electronic, and drone. Avgerinos has worked with the 14th Dalai Lama, President Jimmy Carter and Deepak Chopra. Avgerinos is a member of ASCAP and his music has been used in motion pictures, television shows, and commercials.

== Career ==
Avgerinos graduated from The Peabody Conservatory of Johns Hopkins University in 1981. He served as Principal Bass in the Hong Kong Philharmonic and has worked with Charles Aznavour, Buddy Rich, Aerosmith, Jewel, Run-DMC, Deana Carter and The Celtic Tenors.

Avgerinos' work uses a combination of acoustic and electronic instruments. Avgerinos plays bass violin, cello, guitars, keyboards and sings. Avgerinos often uses romantic and impressionistic techniques as he composes and arranges his New Age productions. Often employing wordless choirs, he sometimes uses lyrics, as in his album of sacred chant Phos Hilaron, and his album GNOSIS, which utilizes Greek Orthodox chanting.

Avgerinos's collaboration with Peter Kater on his 2003 Red Moon album would earn a nomination for a Grammy Award. He has since won four Grammy Awards from six nominations, and won one Latin Grammy Award.

== Awards ==
Award	Year	Album	Category	Result	Ref.
Grammy Awards	2026	Meditations: The Reflections Of His Holiness The Dalai Lama	Best Audio Book, Narration, and Storytelling	Won	
Grammy Awards	2025	Last Sundays in Plains: A Centennial Celebration	Best Audio Book, Narration, and Storytelling	Won	
Grammy Awards	2022	Fandago at the Wall in New York (engineer Paul Avgerinos)	Best Latin Jazz Album	Won	
Grammy Awards	2022	JOY	Best New Age, Ambient or Chant Album	Nominated	
Grammy Awards	2016	GRACE	Best New Age Album	Won	
Grammy Awards	2015	Bhakti	Best New Age Album	Nominated	
Latin Grammy Awards	2020	Puertos: Music From International Waters by Emilio Solla Tango Jazz Orchestra (producer Paul Avgerinos)	Best Jazz Album	Won	
Zone Music Reporter Awards	2011	Bliss	Best Relaxation/Meditation Album	Won	
NAR Lifestyle Music Awards	2007	Garden of Delight	Best World Album	Won	
NAR Lifestyle Music Awards	2006	Gnosis	Best Relaxation/Meditation Album	Won	
NAR Lifestyle Music Awards	2005	Maya	Best Cover Art	Won	

== Discography ==
=== Albums ===
Year	Title	Label
2026	Balance	Round Sky Music
2025	Beloved	Round Sky Music
2024	Gratitude Joy 3	Round Sky Music
2023	Shanti Noel	Round Sky Music
2023	Welcome Home: Poems Inspired by Immigrants w/ Deepak Chopra & Kabir Sehgal	Round Sky Music
2022	JOY	Round Sky Music
2021	PEACE	Round Sky Music
2021	Spiritual Warrior Workout w/ Deepak Chopra & Kabir Sehgal	Round Sky Music
2020	HEALING	Round Sky Music
2020	Gratitude Joy 2	Round Sky Music
2020	Spiritual Warrior with Deepak Chopra & Kabir Sehgal	Round Sky Music
2019	DEVOTION with Krishna Das, Jai Uttal, Donna De Lory and Wah!	Round Sky Music
2019	Musical Meditations on The Seven Spiritual Laws of Success, with Deepak Chopra & Kabir Sehgal	Round Sky Music
2018	Mindfulness	Round Sky Music
2017	Home: Where Everyone Is Welcome - By Deepak Chopra, Kabir Sehgal & Paul Avgerinos	Hachette, NYC
2016	Amma - Devotional Songs to the Divine Mother	Round Sky Music
2015	GRACE	Round Sky Music
2014	BHAKTI	Round Sky Music
2013	RELAX	Round Sky Music
	MEDITATE	Round Sky Music
2012	LOVERS	Round Sky Music
2011	BLISS	Round Sky Music
2010	Law of Attraction	Round Sky Music
2009	LOVE	Round Sky Music
2008	Garden of Delight	Real Music
2007	Gratitude Joy	Round Sky Music
2006	GNOSIS	Round Sky Music
2005	Maya	Round Sky Music
	Phos Hilaron	Round Sky Music
2001	Words Touch	Round Sky Music
1998	Sky of Grace	Round Sky Music
1992	Muse of the Round Sky	Hearts of Space
1988	Maya; The Great Katun	World Room
1987	Balancing Spheres	World Room
1987	Sensual Storm	New World
1986	Tropical Paradise	New World
1986	Island Sanctuary	New World
1985	Celestial Voyage	New World

=== Samplers and collections ===
Year	Title	Label
2008	iRelax with Numi Tea	Real Music
2008	Finding Balance, Sacred Spa Series	Real Music
2005	Relaxation Spa - The Greek Isles	Real Music
2005	Relaxation Spa - The Yucatán	Real Music
2005	Relaxation Spa - The Lost Nexis	Real Music
2002	Oasis Spa Series	SIX Albums
1994	MBNT	Hearts of Space
1994	Omni; Deep Space Vol 4	Hearts of Space
1993	The Absolute Sound	Hearts of Space
1992	Universe Sampler	Hearts of Space
1992	Adventures in Music, New Age 5	Hearts of Space
