= Kabir Sehgal =

American author, musician, and producer

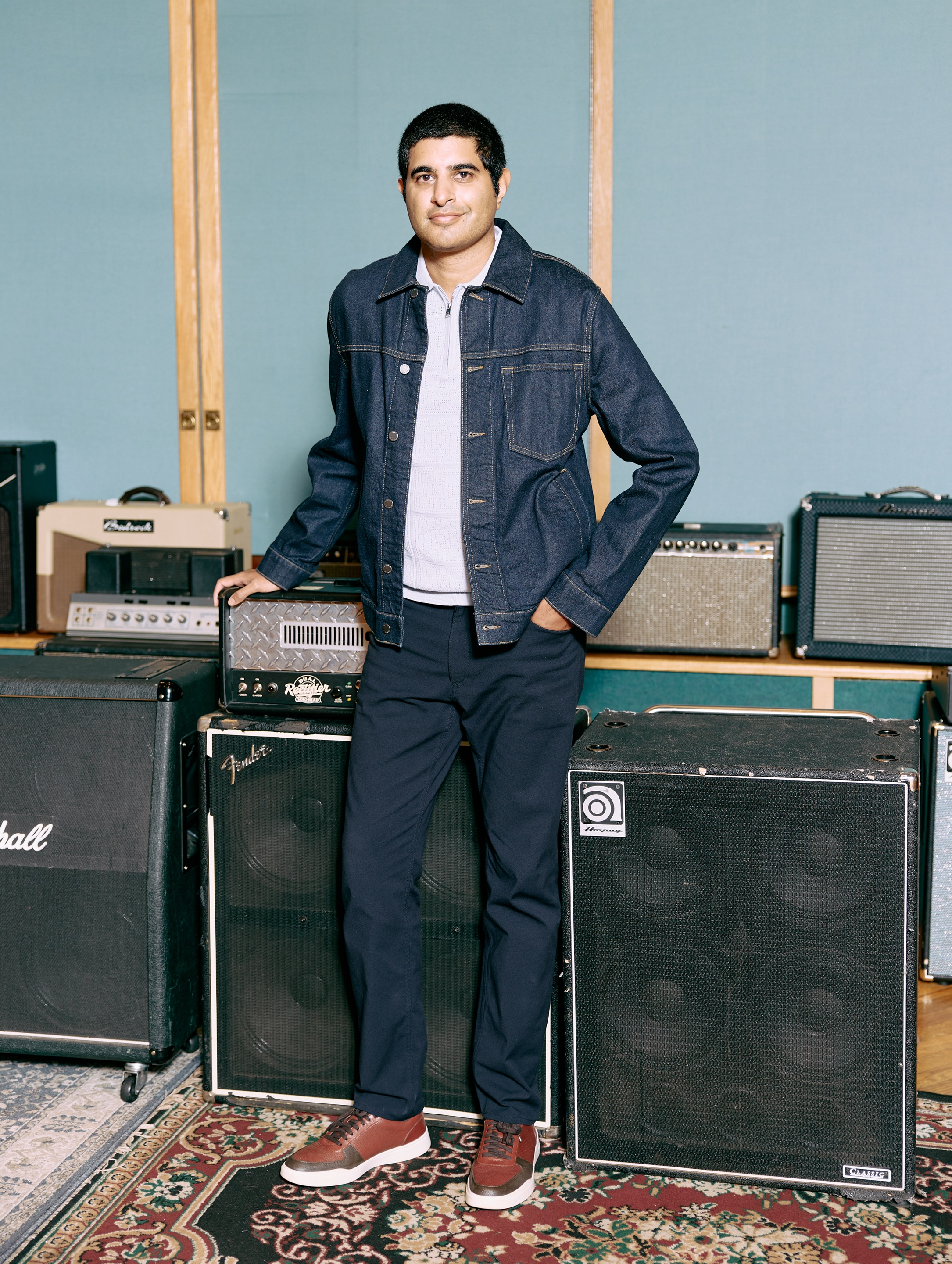
- Born: Atlanta, Georgia
- Education: The Lovett School
- Alma mater: Dartmouth College (AB); London School of Economics (MSc)
- Occupations: Author, record and film producer, jazz musician, composer, investment banker, navy officer
- Awards: Grammy Award; Latin Grammy Award; Emmy Award; Defense Meritorious Service Medal
- Musical career
- Genres: Jazz; blues; classical; world; Latin; electronic; lo-fi
- Instruments: Bass; guitar; synthesizer; keyboard
- Labels: Tiger Turn; Virgin; BMG; Glassnote
- Military career
- Allegiance: United States
- Branch: United States Navy
- Service years: 2011–present
- Rank: Lieutenant Commander
- Unit: US Navy Reserve
- Awards: Defense Meritorious Service Medal
- Website: kabir.cc

Kabir Sehgal is an American author, composer, musician, music and film producer, navy officer, military veteran, investment banker, and financial executive. He is the New York Times and Wall Street Journal bestselling author of 23 books. He has also earned 14 Grammy Awards, 5 Latin Grammy Awards, and multiple Emmy Awards as a record producer, engineer, composer, or arranger. He was previously a vice president at JPMorgan Chase and worked at First Data Corporation.

As an author, Sehgal has written works of nonfiction, poetry, and children's literature. His titles include Coined, Jazzocracy, A Bucket of Blessings, Festival of Colors, and Thread of Love, released by major publishers including Simon & Schuster, Hachette, and Macmillan. Sehgal has co-authored books with public figures, such as Ambassador Andrew Young (Walk in My Shoes), Congressman John Lewis (Carry On), Nobel Peace Prize laureate Muhammad Yunus (Legion of Peace), and Deepak Chopra (Home: Where Everyone Is Welcome). He has also co-authored twelve picture books with his mother, Surishtha Sehgal, which introduce readers to Indian culture and festivals.

As an artist, Sehgal has released 20 albums and 2 EPs across jazz, pop, world, and meditation genres. He has collaborated with artists such as President Jimmy Carter, the Dalai Lama, Harry Belafonte, Lil Jon, Jon Batiste, Andra Day, Keb' Mo', Maggie Rogers, Darius Rucker, and Rufus Wainwright. His projects include Last Sundays in Plains: A Centennial Celebration featuring President Carter, a solo classical guitar album Guitar Spring: Music for a New Season, a series of meditation albums with Lil Jon and Deepak Chopra, and lo-fi instrumental albums. A jazz bassist, composer, and librettist, Sehgal created Angela's Ring: An Opera Revue of the European Debt Crisis, and performed on Swing States by Regina Carter.

As a music producer, Sehgal has produced more than 100 albums across jazz, world, classical, and spoken word, including American Dreamers by John Daversa Big Band featuring DACA artists, Presidential Suite by Ted Nash, Familia: Tribute to Bebo & Chico by Arturo O'Farrill and Chucho Valdés, and Fandango at the Wall by Arturo O'Farrill and the Afro Latin Jazz Orchestra. He has produced recordings for Amjad Ali Khan, Deepak Chopra, Carlos Barbosa-Lima, Karrin Allyson, and Tony Succar. His productions often explore cross-cultural collaborations, social themes, and historical and humanitarian narratives.

As a film and television producer, Sehgal has earned multiple Emmy Awards, with projects focused on music, culture, and global connection. He produced, co-wrote, and appeared in the documentary Fandango at the Wall, released by HBO, which follows musicians performing at the U.S.–Mexico border and explores the role of son jarocho music in bridging communities. Sehgal also directed Close the Loop, which debuted on opening night of the Atlanta Film Festival at the Carter Center.

== Education ==
Sehgal was born in Atlanta, Georgia and attended The Lovett School. He attended Dartmouth College and was a staff columnist for the university newspaper The Dartmouth, bassist for the university jazz band, and a member of Sigma Alpha Epsilon. He completed his postgraduate degree with distinction from the London School of Economics as a Reynolds Scholar.

== Career ==
Kabir Sehgal is the Founder & CEO of Tiger Turn Productions, a multimedia production firm specializing in music, film, and multi-media projects.

He worked in corporate strategy at First Data Corporation, a global payments firm, which completed the largest initial public offering on the New York Stock Exchange in 2015. Previously, Sehgal was a vice president at J.P. Morgan in the emerging markets equities group, where he helped place the Alibaba initial public offering, the largest in history. He began his career by starting an online education company in India with a friend, but it failed.

=== Literary career ===
His first book, Jazzocracy: Jazz, Democracy, and the Creation of a New American Mythology was published in 2008 by Better World Books. Jazzocracy explores the relationship between jazz music and the concept of democracy. He drew upon his experiences serving on the John Kerry presidential campaign and touring with Grammy-winner Wynton Marsalis. The book was later the inspiration for a university course at Baruch College. The book later served as the basis for a TED Talk.

In May 2010, Sehgal's Walk in My Shoes: Conversations between a Civil Rights Legend and his Godson on the Journey Ahead was published by Palgrave Macmillan. The book is co-written by former Mayor of Atlanta Andrew Young, his godfather, who offers his thoughts on leadership, civil rights, love and faith, among other topics. President Bill Clinton wrote the foreword to the book.

Sehgal's book A Bucket of Blessings was published by Simon & Schuster on April 29, 2014, and reached the New York Times best sellers list. A children's book, it chronicles the story of Monkey, a character who tries to bring water to his village at a time of drought, but fails when water leaks out of the bottom of his bucket on his journey. The foreword to the book was written by Maya Angelou. The book was adapted for a stage production at the Alliance Theatre, which ran from January to February 2016.

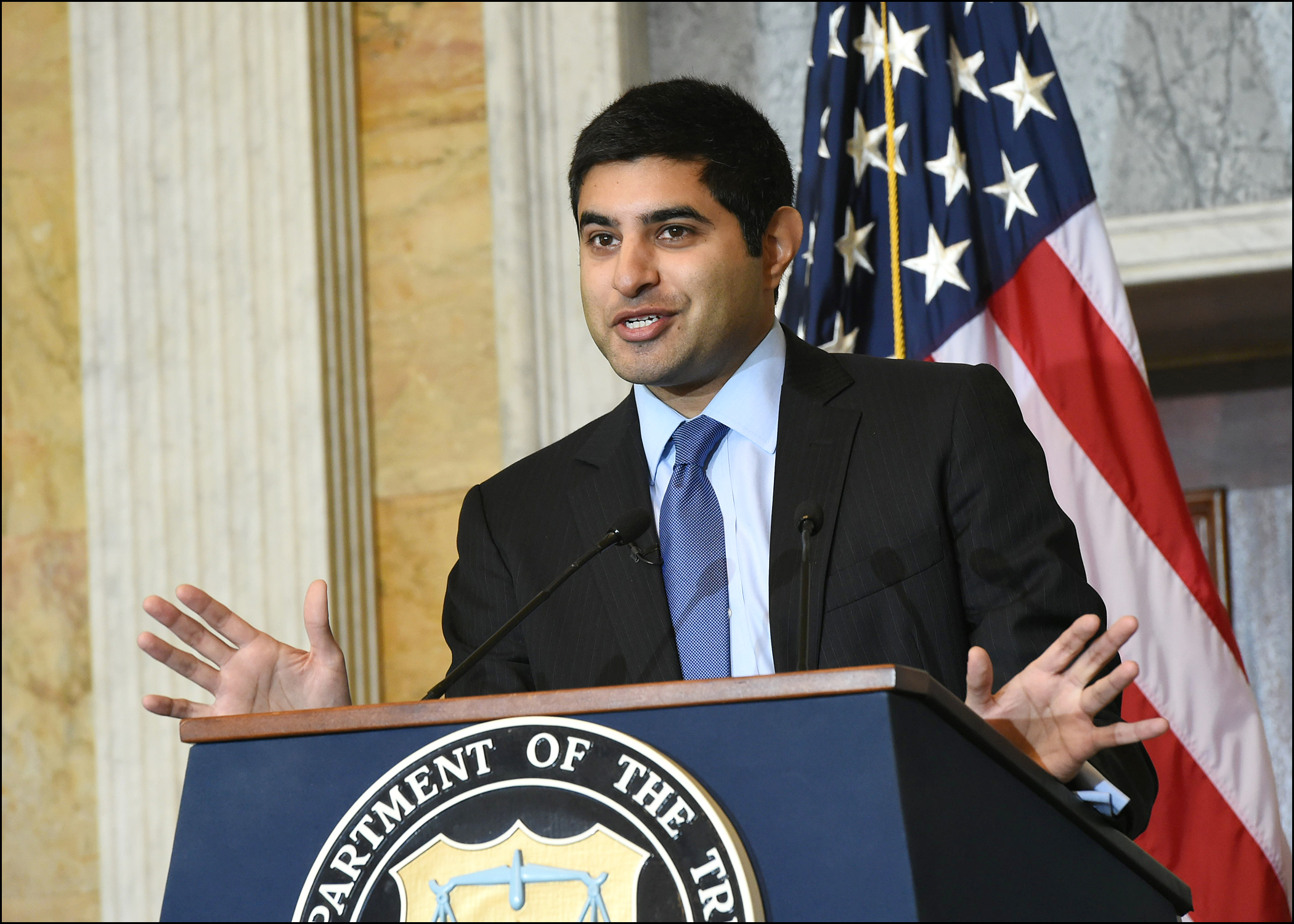
Sehgal speaking at the US Department of Treasury in 2016

His book, Coined: The Rich Life of Money and How Its History Has Shaped Us, was published on March 10, 2015, and was one of Business Insider's top 15 business books coming out in 2015. It examines how and why money has come to play such a central role in everyday life. Topics such as the neuroscience of money behavior and the archaeology of coinage are also examined from and anthropological and historical perspective.

In March 2015, Coined became a New York Times and Wall Street Journal best seller. The New York Times said of Coined, "If you've been waiting for an economic version of 'Eat, Pray, Love,' this may be it." The Financial Times called Coined, "An eclectic and sometimes personal inquiry into the roots of finance takes in everything from Galápagos turtles to Apple Pay."

His children's book The Wheels on the Tuk Tuk was published by Simon & Schuster in January 2016. Publishers Weekly described the book as, "a wonderfully accessible introduction to daily life in another place."

Kabir Sehgal wrote a book of poetry with Deepak Chopra, Home: Where Everyone is Welcome, which was published by Grand Central Publishing in August 2017. The book is composed of 34 poems inspired various American immigrants such as Albert Einstein and Madeleine Albright. The book became a Publishers Weekly bestseller.

Sehgal's book Fandango at the Wall was published by Grand Central Publishing in October 2018. It describes the Mexican traditions of fandango and son jarocho music. It comes with a music CD that combines Afro Latin Jazz and son jarocho music. It also details the history of the relationship between the United States and Mexico. The foreword to the book is written by Douglas Brinkley and the afterword is by Andrew Young. The book was nominated for an Audie Award for Best Original work in 2019.

Simon & Schuster published Sehgal's children's book Festival of Colors, which is about Holi, the Indian festival of colors in January 2018. It was named a Favorite Picture Book of the Year by Barnes & Noble and book all young Georgians should read in 2018 by Georgia Center for the Book. Simon & Schuster published Sehgal's children's book Thread of Love, which is about the Indian tradition of raksha bandhan, in October 2018. It was named a Best Children's Book of 2018, according to the Seattle Public Library.

Sehgal co-wrote Legion of Peace: Twenty Paths to Super Happiness with Muhammad Yunus, the Nobel Peace Prize Recipient in 2006, Monica Yunus, and Camille Zamora. Hachette published the book in December 2018.

Sehgal's children's book P is For Poppadoms! was published by Simon and Schuster in November 2019. It is an Indian alphabet book.

Sehgal, with his father R.K. Sehgal, co-wrote the book Close the Loop: The Life of an American Dream CEO and His Five Lessons for Success, published in May 2020 by Hachette. It is a biography of Sehgal's father talking about his journey as an Indian immigrant, coming to the United States and working his way to become a businessman and government official. It became a Los Angeles Times and San Francisco Chronicle bestseller.

Sehgal co-wrote Carry On: Reflections for a New Generation with John Lewis. The memoir was published in 2021 by Grand Central Publishing, a year after Lewis' death, and became a National Indie Bestseller. The audio book, read by Don Cheadle and produced by Sehgal, won the Grammy Award for Best Spoken Word Album in 2022. It was nominated for an Audie Award for Best Business and Personal Development book.

In 2022, Sehgal and his mother, Surishtha Sehgal, released Mother Goose Goes to India, published by Simon & Schuster, followed later that year by It’s Diwali. Their 2023 book Bhangra Baby was praised by Kirkus Reviews as "an entertaining introduction to the fundamentals of bhangra and a sweet tribute to Punjabi culture."

In 2024, Sehgal and his mother published Seven Samosas, which Publishers Weekly described as having "rhythmically propulsive language and vibrant, naif-style digital illustrations," and the book was selected as an Amazon Editor's Pick.

In 2024, Sehgal and Lil Jon published Manifest Abundance: Affirmations for Personal Growth, which is an interactive workbook.

Sehgal and his mother wrote Himalayan Nights, which was published by Simon & Schuster in 2025. The School Library Journal wrote, "This may become the most circulated work of this genre."

His book Hello India is scheduled for release in 2026, while Our Big Indian Family is scheduled for 2027.

Sehgal's writings have appeared in The New York Times, Fortune, Foreign Policy, Harvard Business Review, MarketWatch, Newsweek, The Nation, New York Observer, Quartz, Zero Hedge, Atlanta Journal-Constitution, Atlanta Business Chronicle, CNBC, Reader's Digest, entrepreneur, Inc. and The Street. He has appeared on CNN, PBS, NPR, Bloomberg, Fox News, CNBC, C-SPAN, Cheddar TV, National Geographic Channel and Fusion. He co-founded the journal of information systems at the London School of Economics.

Harvard Business Review named Sehgal's article "Why You Should Have (at Least) Two Careers" as one of the 30 most influential in its 100 years. It was also included in the book HBR at 100: The Most Influential and Innovative Articles from Harvard Business Review’s first century.

Sehgal writes the weekly Seven Point Sunday newsletter which he founded in March 2021.

=== Music career ===
Sehgal is a jazz bassist, composer, and Grammy Award-winning producer. He has produced albums for Jimmy Carter, Dalai Lama, Deepak Chopra, Lil Jon, Chucho Valdés, Arturo O'Farrill, Ted Nash, Carlos Barbosa-Lima, Gabriel Alegria, Pablo Ziegler, John Daversa, Lori Henriques, Paul Avgerinos, Pedro Giraudo, Manuel Valera, Emilio Solla, and Gregorio Uribe. He has earned 14 Grammys and 5 Latin Grammys as a producer and engineer. His productions have received over twenty nominations and twenty awards.

He was the executive producer, producer, and liner notes author for The Offense of the Drum by Arturo O'Farrill and the Afro Latin Jazz Orchestra. The album won the Grammy Award for the Best Latin Jazz Album and the 2015 Cubadisco for Best International Album. It was also nominated for a Latin Grammy for Best Latin Jazz Album.

In December 2014, Sehgal and O'Farrill led a delegation to Havana to record Cuba: The Conversation Continues. The album was released in August 2015, with Sehgal serving as executive producer, liner notes author, and artistic producer. The New York Times said that it was "an album worthy of its moment, an ambitious statement that honors deeply held musical traditions while pushing forward." The album was voted Best Latin Jazz Album of the year by an NPR critics' poll and was nominated for the Grammy for Best Large Jazz Ensemble Album. "The Afro Latin Jazz Suite" won the Grammy for Best Instrumental Composition. Cuba: The Conversation Continues won the Latin Grammy for Best Latin Jazz Album.

Sehgal served as executive producer and artistic producer of Presidential Suite: Eight Variations on Freedom by the Ted Nash Big Band. The album features several notable figures, such as Andrew Young, Glenn Close, and Sam Waterston reading speeches by former presidents. Sehgal wrote the liner notes with Douglas Brinkley. The album won the Grammy Award for Best Large Jazz Ensemble Album. JazzTimes said that during his acceptance speech, "Sehgal gracefully pushed back against the current administration." "While one president says, 'Build a wall,' " Sehgal said, "another said, 'Tear this wall down.'" In addition, a selection on the album "Spoken at Midnight" won the Grammy for Best Instrumental Composition.

Sehgal served as the executive and artistic producer of Familia: Tribute to Bebo & Chico by Arturo O'Farrill & Chucho Valdés. He authored the liner notes and wrote a composition "Raja Ram" which features Grammy nominated sitarist Anoushka Shankar. In 2017, a selection from the album "Three Revolutions" won a Grammy in Best Instrumental Composition.

Sehgal served as the producer and liner notes author of Jazz Tango by Pablo Ziegler Trio, which won a Grammy for Best Latin Jazz Album in 2017. He also served as the producer and liner notes author for Vigor Tanguero by Pedro Giraudo, which won the Latin Grammy for Best Tango Album in 2018.

Sehgal served as the producer of Legion of Peace: Songs Inspired by Nobel Peace Laureates by Lori Henriques Quintet featuring Joey Alexander with Muhammad Yunus. The album was released on the International Day of Peace, September 21, 2018. He also played the bass on the album. Each song is about a different Nobel Peace Laureate such as Malala Yousafzai and Desmond Tutu.

Sehgal served as the executive producer of Fandango at the Wall by Arturo O’Farrill and the Afro Latin Jazz Orchestra which was released in September 2018 by Resilience Music Alliance. Sehgal also composed a piece on the two-disc album, and he played the bass and Leona. Sehgal led a delegation of musicians to the border wall between San Diego and Tijuana to record musicians on both sides of the wall. The project was inspired by the Fandango Fronterizo festival in which son jarocho musicians perform a fandango on both sides of the border. Special guests featured on the album include Regina Carter, Antonio Sanchez, Ana Tijoux, Mandy Gonzalez, Akua Dixon, the Villalobos Brothers, and Rahim AlHaj. It also features son jarocho musicians such as Patricio Hidalgo, Fernando Guadarrama, Tacho Utrera, and Ramon Gutierrez. The album was called "The Most Valuable Music of 2018" by The Nation. The song "Line in the Sand" on the album was released in partnership with UNICEF.

Sehgal served as a producer of American Dreamers: Voices of Hope, Music of Freedom by John Daversa Big Band Featuring 53 DACA recipients, which was released in September 2018. Sehgal also played bass and wrote the liner notes. The project was endorsed by Speaker of the House Nancy Pelosi, Senators Kamala Harris. The project won 3 Grammy Awards: Best Large Jazz Ensemble Album; Best Arrangement, Instrumental or A Capella; and Best Improvised Jazz Solo.

In 2017, selections of Sehgal's opera Angela Ring were performed at Carnegie Hall. In 2021, he released his opera album Angela's Ring: An Opera Revue of the European Debt Crisis featuring Grace Kelly, Aaron Diehl, Lucy Schaufer, Papo Vázquez, and Edmar Castañeda. It features spoken word news readings by journalists Betty Liu, Steve Liesman, and Paul Vigna.

In 2019, Sehgal produced Balance by Gustavo Casenave, which won the Latin Grammy Award for Best Instrumental Album. He also wrote the liner notes. Sehgal produced Marrón y Azul by Daniel Binelli and Nick Danielson. He also produced Radiotango by Pablo Ziegler Quartet. Both projects were nominated for a Latin Grammy Award for Best Tango Album.

In 2020, Sehgal produced Fuelle y Cuerda by Gustavo Casenave, which won the Latin Grammy Award for Best Tango Album. He also produced Puertos: Music from International Waters by Emilio Solla Tango Jazz Orchestra, and he also wrote the liner notes. The project won the Latin Grammy Award for Best Latin Jazz Album.

Sehgal produced the Brian Lynch Big Band's The Omni-American Book Club which won the Grammy Award for Best Large Jazz Ensemble Album in 2020. The album was inspired by The Omni-Americans by Albert Murray.

Sehgal produced Arturo O'Farrill's Four Questions, which featured the spoken word performance of Cornel West in 2020. It won the Grammy Award for Best Latin Jazz Album in 2021. Sehgal also produced Gregg August's Dialogues on Race which was nominated for a Grammy for Best Large Jazz Ensemble Album.

In 2021, Sehgal released Threshold, his first pop EP that featured singers Danay Suárez, Manu Manzo, Sonna Rele, Thana Alexa, and Alyssa Raghu.

In 2021, Sehgal produced Carry on: Reflections for a New Generation From John Lewis, based on his book with John Lewis. Actor Don Cheadle narrated the audiobook, which won the Grammy for Best Spoken Word Album in 2022. Sehgal also produced O'Farrill's Virtual Birdland which featured performances that O'Farrill and his orchestra made during the COVID-19 pandemic. It was nominated for a Grammy in Best Latin Jazz Album. Sehgal also produced Carlos Henriquez's The South Bronx Story which was also Grammy nominated for Best Latin Jazz album.

In 2022, Sehgal released an album Sand and Foam: Music Inspired by Kahlil Gibran in collaboration with Amaan Ali Bangash and Ayaan Ali Bangash. Sehgal also released a pop EP Threshold that featured Nicole Zuraitis and Sonna Rele.

In 2022, Sehgal produced Fandango at the Wall in New York by Arturo O'Farrill and the Afro Latin Jazz Orchestra, featuring the Conga Patria Son Jarocho Collective, which won the Grammy for Best Latin Jazz Album. He also produced Generation Gap Jazz Orchestra by Bijon Watson and Steven Feifke, which won the Grammy Award for Best Large Jazz Ensemble Album. He co-produced the Alphabet Rockers' The Movement which won the Grammy Award for Best Children's Music Album. Sehgal also produced Black Men Are Precious by E. Ethelbert Miller, which was Grammy nominated for Best Spoken Word Poetry Album.

In 2023, Sehgal co-produced Nicole Zuraitis' How Love Begins, which won the Grammy Award for Best Jazz Vocal Album. He also wrote the liner notes.

In 2024, Sehgal was a co-artist with President Jimmy Carter on Last Sundays in Plains: A Centennial Celebration. Sehgal also produced the project, created the instrumental accompaniments to Carter's Sunday school lessons, and served as a recording and mixing engineer. The project featured LeAnn Rimes, Darius Rucker, Keb' Mo', and Jon Batiste. Sehgal and Jonathan Alter wrote the liner notes. The project won the Grammy Award for Best Audio Book five weeks after Carter's death, with Jason Carter—President Carter's grandson—and Sehgal accepting the award on his behalf. During his speech, Jason said, "Kabir has been a part of our family and close with our family for a long time. So, Kabir Sehgal had this idea and put it together."

Sehgal produced Dan Pugach's Bianca Reimagined: Music for Paws and Persistence inspired by Pugach's pit bull, who was then deceased. He also wrote the liner notes. The project won the Grammy Award for Best Large Jazz Ensemble Album.

In 2024, Sehgal and Lil Jon released a guided meditation album Total Meditation. They released a second meditation album Manifest Abundance in May 2024. Their third meditation album, titled Remix Meditation, was released on October 30, 2025. It reimagines several of Lil Jon's productions such as "Yeah!", "Turn Down for What", and "Get Low" as guided meditations.

In 2024, Sehgal released his debut solo classical guitar album Guitar Spring: Music for a New Season.

In 2025, Sehgal was a co-artist and producer on Meditations: The Reflections of His Holiness the Dalai Lama, a project created with the Dalai Lama and Amjad Ali Khan that also features Amaan Ali Bangash, Ayaan Ali Bangash, Andra Day, Ted Nash, Debi Nova, Maggie Rogers, Tony Succar, and Rufus Wainwright. It won the Grammy in Best Audio Book, Narration, & Storytelling for the 68th Grammy Awards.

Sehgal also produced Mundoagua: Celebrating Carla Bley and The Original Influencers: Dizzy, Chano, & Chico (Live at Town Hall) by Arturo O'Farrill and the Afro Latin Jazz Orchestra. Both were nominated for Best Latin Jazz Album at the 68th Grammys. Mundoagua is structured in three meditative passages and explores themes of ecological crisis, with an emphasis on water.

In 2025, he released bells and beats: retro reflections on the holidays (lofi vol. 1), the first of a series of lo-fi music albums.

=== Film career ===
Sehgal has earned multiple Emmy Awards as a film and television producer.

Sehgal is the executive producer, producer, and co-writer of the film Fandango at the Wall. It follows Arturo O'Farrill and Sehgal to Veracruz, Mexico, where they jam with the masters of son jarocho. Arturo's orchestra and the masters of son jarocho perform in the U.S.–Mexico border for a son jarocho music and dance festival called Fandango Fronterizo. The film's executive producers include Quincy Jones, Andrew Young, Carlos Santana, and Sehgal. The film premiered at the Atlanta Film Festival and on HBO. The film won the Audience Award of the Best Feature Documentary at the San Diego Latino Film Festival.

A short of the film Music Without Borders was selected as a finalist for the Migrant Voice Film Challenge.

Sehgal is the director and producer of Close the Loop, a documentary based on his father Raghbir (R. K.) Sehgal. The film was featured on opening night of the Atlanta Film Festival in 2022.

=== Philanthropy ===
In 2006, Sehgal co-founded Music for Tomorrow (MFT), a non-profit organization that initially raised money to help musicians return to New Orleans after Hurricane Katrina. Eventually, the organization became an online band booking service that people used to book jazz musicians in various cities across America while generating voluntary "tips" to help New Orleans–based charities. In 2014, MFT merged with the Afro Latin Jazz Alliance. During the 2020 COVID-19 pandemic, Sehgal hosted the Quarantine Series, which featured over 100 live performances of artists, providing them a gig.

He serves on the advisory board of the NYU Stern Center for Business and Human Rights. He is a lifetime member of the Council on Foreign Relations. He is a French-American Foundation Young Leader and was named a Young Global Leader by the World Economic Forum in 2020.

=== Military service ===
Sehgal is an officer in the U.S. Navy Reserve. He served on active duty with special operations in the Middle East and received a Defense Meritorious Service Medal.

=== Personal life ===
Sehgal is the grandson of Piara Singh Gill, an Indian nuclear scientist; and the son of R.K.Sehgal, a businessman and public official in the state of Georgia. He is godson of Andrew Young, who served as an advisor to Martin Luther King Jr., and was a U.S. ambassador to the United Nations.

== Bibliography ==
- 2008 Jazzocracy: Jazz, Democracy, and the Creation of a New American Mythology
- 2010 Walk in My Shoes: Conversations between a Civil Rights Legend and his Godson on the Journey Ahead
- 2014 A Bucket of Blessings
- 2015 Coined: The Rich Life of Money and How Its History Has Shaped Us
- 2016 The Wheels on the Tuk Tuk
- 2017 Home: Where Everyone Is Welcome
- 2018 Festival of Colors
- 2018 Thread of Love
- 2018 Fandango at the Wall: Creating Harmony Between the United States and Mexico
- 2018 Legion of Peace
- 2019 P is for Poppadoms
- 2020 Close the Loop: The Life of an American Dream CEO & His Five Lessons for Success
- 2021 Carry On: Reflections for a New Generation
- 2022 Mother Goose Goes to India
- 2022 It’s Diwali
- 2023 Bhangra Baby
- 2024 Seven Samosas
- 2024 Manifest Abundance: Affirmations for Personal Growth
- 2025 Himalayan Nights
- 2026 Hello India
- 2027 Our Big Indian Family

== Selected discography ==
=== As an artist ===
- 2017: Home: Where Everyone Is Welcome
- 2019: Musical Meditations on the Seven Spiritual Laws of Success
- 2020: Spiritual Warrior
- 2021: Angela’s Ring: An Opera Revue of the European Debt Crisis
- 2021: Threshold
- 2021: Spiritual Warrior Workout
- 2022: Sand and Foam: Music Inspired by Kahlil Gibran
- 2023: Unfolding
- 2023: Welcome Home: Poems Inspired by Immigrants
- 2024: Total Meditation
- 2024: Guitar Spring: Music for a New Season
- 2024: Manifest Abundance: Affirmations for Personal Growth
- 2024: Last Sundays in Plains: A Centennial Celebration
- 2025: One Hour to Deep Sleep
- 2025: Power Nap: Musical Meditations for Rest, Relaxation, Rejuvenation
- 2025: Meditations: The Reflections of His Holiness the Dalai Lama
- 2025: bells & beats: retro reflections on the holidays, lofi vol. 1
- 2025: Remix Meditation
- 2026: Beautiful Sleep: Mellow Music for Rest, Relaxation, Rejuvenation
- 2026: stars and static 2026: textured takes on 250 years of america, lofi vol. 2
- 2026: Whispering Nature

=== As a producer ===
With Arturo O'Farill

- 2011: 40 Acres and a Burro (Associate Producer)
- 2014: The Offense of the Drum (Executive Producer, producer, Liner Notes)
- 2015: Cuba: The Conversation Continues (Executive Producer, Producer, Liner Notes)
- 2017: Familia: Tribute to Bebo & Chico (Executive Producer, Producer, Liner Notes, Composer)
- 2018: Fandango at the Wall (Executive Producer, producer, Liner Notes, composer, Bass, Leona, Vocals)
- 2020: Four Questions (Executive Producer, producer, Liner Notes)
- 2021: Virtual Birdland (Producer, Liner Notes)
- 2021: …dreaming in lions… (Producer)
- 2022: Fandango at the Wall in New York (Executive Producer, Producer)
- 2023: Legacies (Producer)
- 2025: Mundoagua – Celebrating Carla Bley (Producer)
- 2025: The Original Influencers: Dizzy, Chano & Chico (Producer)

With others

- 2015: 10 – Gabriel Alegria Afro-Peruvian Sextet (Producer)
- 2015: Cumbia Universal – Gregorio Uribe (Producer, Associate Producer, Liner Notes)
- 2016: Presidential Suite: Eight Variations on Freedom – Ted Nash (Executive Producer, producer, Liner Notes)
- 2016: Native Land – Gwen Hughes (Producer)
- 2016: Runaway Train – Joe Mulholland Trio (Executive Producer, Producer)
- 2016: Tributango – Emilio Solla (Executive Producer, Producer)
- 2016: Carlos Barbosa-Lima Plays Mason Williams – Carlos Barbosa-Lima (Producer)
- 2017: Home: Where Everyone Is Welcome (Artist, Producer, Liner Notes, Bass, Composer)
- 2017: Jazz Tango – Pablo Ziegler (Producer, Liner Notes)
- 2017: Maple Leaf Rag – Chris Washburne (Producer, Liner Notes)
- 2017: Rediscovered Ellington – Dial & Oatts, Rich DeRosa, The WDR Big Band (Producer, Liner Notes)
- 2018: Mortality Mansions – Herschel Garfein & Donald Hall (Producer)
- 2018: Argentina vs. Uruguay – Gustavo Casenave & Dario Boente (Executive Producer, producer, Liner Notes)
- 2018: Vigor Tanguero – Pedro Giraudo (Producer, Liner Notes)
- 2018: An Argentinian in New York – Pedro Giraudo (Producer, Liner Notes)
- 2018: China Caribe – Dongfeng Liu (Producer, Liner Notes)
- 2018: American Dreamers – John Daversa Big Band Featuring DACA Artists (Executive Producer, producer, Liner Notes, Bass, Composer)
- 2018: Legion of Peace – Lori Henriques Quartet featuring Joey Alexander (Executive Producer, producer, Bass, Liner Notes)
- 2018: The Planets – Manuel Valera Trio (Producer, Liner Notes)
- 2018: Mindfulness – Paul Avgerinos (Producer)
- 2019: Meditations on the Seven Spiritual Laws of Success – Deepak Chopra, Paul Avgerinos, Kabir Sehgal (Artist, Producer)
- 2020: Spiritual Warrior – Deepak Chopra, Paul Avgerinos, Kabir Sehgal (Executive Producer, producer, Artist)
- 2020: Swing States – Regina Carter (Executive Producer, producer, Liner Notes, Bass, Percussion)
