= John Daversa =

American musician and educator

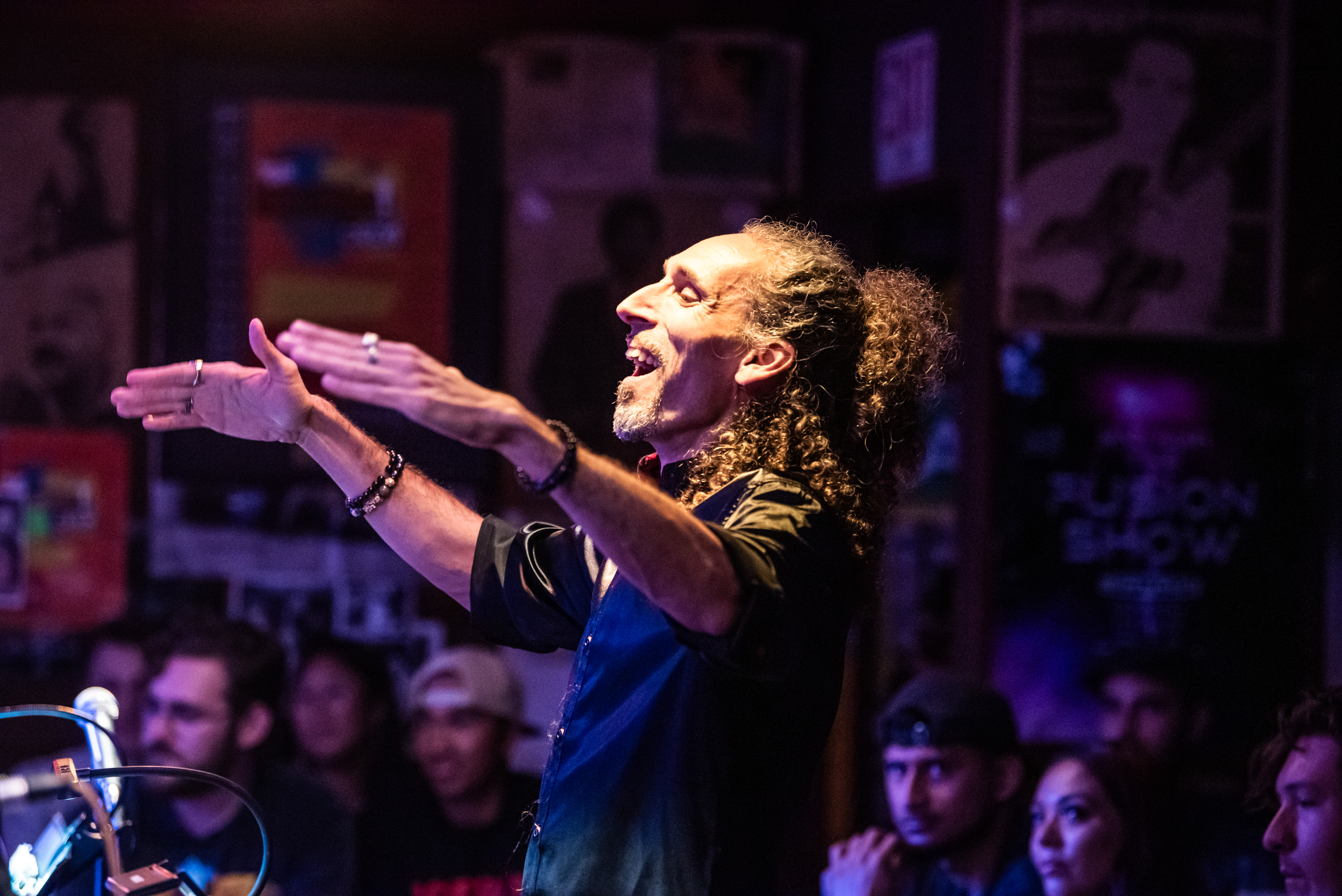

Background information
- Born: John Austin Daversa; October 2, 1972 (age 54); Canoga Park, California, U.S.
- Genres: Jazz, Jazz Fusion, Jazz Orchestral, Free Jazz, Latin Jazz, Contemporary Jazz
- Occupations: Musician, Composer, Arranger, Bandleader, Conductor, Producer, Educator
- Instruments: Trumpet, Flugelhorn, Electronic Valve Instrument (EVI), Piano, Bass, Vocals
- Years active: 1990's - Present
- Labels: BFM Jazz, Blue Canoe Records, Daversafications Publications, Tiger Turn
- Website: johndaversa.com

John Daversa is an American jazz trumpeter, electronic valve instrument (EVI) player, vocalist, composer, arranger, conductor, bandleader, producer and educator who has won multiple Grammy awards.

== Early life ==
Daversa is the son of Jay Daversa, trumpeter for Stan Kenton and Los Angeles studio musician, and Mary Ann Daversa, music educator and pianist. The grandson of Italian immigrants, he was born in Los Angeles and moved to Ada, Oklahoma at age 7. He also lived in Las Vegas and Sacramento before returning to Los Angeles for high school at Hamilton Academy of Music.

== Career ==
Daversa has degrees from UCLA, California Institute of the Arts, and a doctorate from USC. He is Chair of Studio Music and Jazz at University of Miami, Frost School of Music and directs the Frost Jazz Orchestra (2013 to present). Before this appointment, he taught at California State University, Northridge (2011 - 2013) and University of Southern California (2009 - 2011). He regularly performs with the John Daversa Big Band, John Daversa Small Band, John Daversa and Tal Cohen Duo, and is a guest conductor and soloist all over the world.

Daversa has worked with Moonchild, Fiona Apple, Burt Bacharach, Joe Cocker, Andraé Crouch, Gin, Herbie Hancock, Holiday on Ice, Bob Mintzer Big Band, Renee Olstead, Regina Spektor, Andy Williams, and The Yellowjackets. His playing has been featured on film and television, including The Five-Year Engagement, Key and Peele, The King of Queens, and Promised Land.

His album American Dreamers: Voices of Hope, Music of Freedom (BFM Jazz, 2018) won three Grammy Awards at the 61st Annual Grammy Awards: Best Large Jazz Ensemble Album, "Don't Fence Me In" won in the Best Improvised Jazz Solo category, and "Stars and Stripes Forever" won in the Best Arrangement, Instrumental or A Cappella category.

== Discography ==
=== As leader ===
- Improvisatory Observatory: Live and Raw at The Baked Potato, Exhibit 2, John Daversa Big Band, 2024
- Improvisatory Observatory: Live and Raw at The Baked Potato, Exhibit 1, John Daversa Big Band, 2024
- The Official Bootleg: live at bluewhale, John Daversa Small Band, 2024 (Recorded live in 2012)
- The Art of Duo, Vol. 1, John Daversa and Tal Cohen, 2024 (Original release 2023)
- Live at Catalina’s, Vol. 2, John Daversa Big Band, 2024 (Recorded live in 2000)
- ARCeology: The Music of MSM Schmidt, Arc Trio and The John Daversa Big Band 2022
- All Without Words: Variations Inspired by Loren, John Daversa Jazz Orchestra featuring Justin Morell, 2021
- Cuarentena: With Family at Home, John Daversa Quintet, Cuarentena: With Family at Home, 2020
- American Dreamers: Voices of Hope, Music of Freedom, John Daversa Big Band featuring DACA Artists, 2018
- Wobbly Dance Flower, John Daversa featuring Bob Mintzer, 2017
- Kaleidoscope Eyes: Music of the Beatles, John Daversa, 2016
- Artful Joy, John Daversa, 2012
- Junk Wagon: The Big Band Album, John Daversa, 2011
- Shogun Warrior, Plays for Lovers, Shogun Warrior, 2010
- Westland, Westland Trio, 2010
- Live at Catalina’s, (Vol. I), John Daversa Big Band, 2009 (Recorded live in 2000)
- Live at Catalina’s, Vol. II, John Daversa Big Band, 2000
- The D.a.M. Band, The Daversa and Morell Band, 1994

=== As producer or co-producer ===
- Improvisatory Observatory: Live and Raw at The Baked Potato, Exhibit 2, John Daversa Big Band, 2024
- Improvisatory Observatory: Live and Raw at The Baked Potato, Exhibit 1, John Daversa Big Band, 2024
- The Official Bootleg: live at bluewhale, John Daversa Small Band, 2024 (Recorded live in 2012)
- Live at Catalina’s, Vol. 2, John Daversa Big Band, 2024 (Recorded live in 2000)
- The Art of Duo, Vol. 1, John Daversa and Tal Cohen, 2024 (Original release 2023)
- Live at Gusman Concert Hall 2023, Frost Jazz Orchestra 2023
- Swing States: Harmony in the Battleground (Feat. Jon Batiste, John Daversa, and Harvey Mason) Regina Carter Freedom Band, 2020
- Shoulder to Shoulder: Centennial Tribute to Women’s Suffrage, Karrin Allyson Sextet, 2019
- Justin Morell Concerto for Guitar and Jazz Orchestra (feat. Adam Rogers), Frost Concert Jazz Band, Conducted by John Daversa, 2018
- Transcendence, Trinity Devi, 2018
- Europa: Explorations for Large Jazz Ensemble, Frost Concert Jazz Band, Conducted by John Daversa, 2017
- Kaleidoscope Eyes: Music of the Beatles, John Daversa, 2016
- Harmony – Venus Gong, Trinity Devi, 2015
- Oneness – Ek Ong Kar Gong, Trinity Devi, 2015
- Focus, Kendall Moore, 2014
- El Guapo, Scott Jeppesen, 2013
- Love for Sale, James Tormé, 2011
- Live at Catalina’s, (Vol. I), John Daversa Big Band, 2009 (Recorded live in 2000)
- Buck’s Vibe, Peter Buck, 2008
- Time for Christmas, Phil Crosby, Jr., 2007
- Live at Catalina’s, Vol. II, John Daversa Big Band, 2000

=== As band-member ===
- Searching for a Memory, Busco Tu Recuerdo, Sammy Figueroa featuring Gonzalo Rubalcaba and Aymée Nuviola, 2023
- Calasanitus, Leon Foster Thomas, 2023
- Come Fly With Me (Single), Ledisi, Gregg Field, John Daversa, Patti Austin, Randy Waldman, Willie Murillo, Jeff Driskill, Erik Hughes, and Kate Duhamel, 2021
- LowJacked, Jackson 6, 2021
- Cheap Thrill: The Music of Rick Margitza (feat. Chuck Bergeron), South Florida Jazz Orchestra, 2020
- Swing States: Harmony in the Battleground (Feat. Jon Batiste, John Daversa, and Harvey Mason) Regina Carter Freedom Band, 2020
- Ahreum Ash Hanyou, Ahreum Ash Hanyou, 2018
- BACHanalia, Bill Cunliffe, 2017
- Life, MSM Schmidt (featuring Virgil Donati, Jimmy Haslip, Scott Kinsey, Mike Miller, Oz Noy), 2017
- Come to Paradise, Suzanne Dean, 2016
- The Deadbeats, The Deadbeats, 2016
- Inner Circle, Zach Larmer Band, 2016
- Metamorphasis, Leon Foster Thomas, 2016
- Pelos Ares, Rafael Piccolotto de Lima, Orquestra Urbana, 2016
- Get Up!, Bob Mintzer Big Band, 2015
- Self Taught, Brandon Coleman, 2015
- Exploring Mars, Josh Nelson, 2014
- Original Cities Original Jazz and Chamber Music, Mitch Haupers, 2014
- A Perfect Contradiction, Paloma Faith, 2014
- Come Over, Gina Kronstadt,2013
- Dectet: Subjects and Compliments, Justin Morell, 2013
- HighJacked, Jackson 6, 2013
- Storyteller, Nick Mancini, 2013
- Be Free, Moonchild, 2012
- Blujanova, Jeff Saxon, 2012
- Critics’ Choices and other Voices, Jazziz on Disc, 2012
- Fire It Up, Joe Cocker, 2012
- Jimmy Branly, Jimmy Branly (featuring Abraham Laboriel and Otmaro Ruiz), 2012
- Mountain Suite, Kait Dunton, 2012
- Psychobabble, Nick Mancini, 2012
- Rozalia, Nikos Syropoulos, 2012
- Tales from The Blue Whale, Endermen, 2012
- What We Saw from the Cheap Seats, Regina Spektor, 2012
- Blue Collection, Ladybug Music, 2011
- Green Collection, Ladybug Music, 2011
- The Journey, Andrae Crouch, 2011
- Purple Collection, Ladybug Music, 2011
- Timeline, Yellowjackets, 2011
- A-Me, Hire Sekine, 2010
- Numbers, Jay Daversa, 2010
- Red Collection, Ladybug Music, 2010
- Yellow Collection, Ladybug Music, 2010
- Holy Smoke, Gin Wigmore, 2009
- Pin Points and Gin Joints, The Mightly Mightly Bosstones, 2009
- The Roads We’ve Taken, International Trumpet Guild, 2009
- For My Lady, Sherman Pore, 2007
- Lamplighter, Eleisha Eagle, 2007
- Live at Café Metropole, Kim Richmond, 2007
- Soul Sistah, Marva King, 2006
- At This Time, Burt Bacharach, 2005
- Carmine Caruso International Jazz Trumpet Solo Competition (1993 – 2003), International Trumpet Guild, 2005
- Extraordinary Machine, Fiona Apple, 2005
- Broject, Jeff Babko feat. Toss Panos, 2004
- The End of Imagining, The Space Twins, 2003
- The Music of Steely Dan, Justin Morell, 2002
- Septet, Justin Morell, 2000
- Misfits of Silence, Jeff Babko, 1998
- Variety Arts Center – Los Angeles, Progfest ’94, 1995

== Awards ==
- Latin Grammy Nomination, Best Latin Jazz Album (arranger and trumpet), Searching for a Memory, Busco Tu Recuerdo, 2024
- Southeast Emmy Awards Nomination (co-producer, cast), American Dreamers, 2023
- Philip Frost Award for Excellence in Teaching and Scholarship, 2020
- Proclamation “John Daversa Day”, The City of Miami Beach, February 23, 2020
- Grammy Award for Best Large Jazz Ensemble, American Dreamers: Voices of Hope, Music of Freedom, John Daversa Big Band Featuring DACA Artists, 2019
- Grammy Award for Best Arrangement, Instrumental or A Capella, "Stars and Stripes Forever”, 2019
- Grammy Award for Best Improvised Solo "Don’t Fence Me In”, 2019
- Grammy Nomination for Best Large Jazz Ensemble, Kaleidoscope Eyes: Music of The Beatles, John Daversa, 2017
- Grammy Nomination for Best Arrangement Instrumental, "Lucy In The Sky With Diamonds", 2017
- Grammy Nomination Best Arrangement Vocals or Acapella "Do You Want To Know A Secret" featuring Renee Olstead, 2017
- Global Music Awards Gold Medal Winner, Large Jazz Ensemble, Kaleidoscope Eyes: Music of The Beatles, 2016
- Global Music Awards Gold Medal Winner, Composition/Composer, Kaleidoscope Eyes: Music of The Beatles, 2016
- Global Music Awards Gold Medal Winner, Band, Kaleidoscope Eyes: Music of The Beatles, 2016
- Global Music Awards Gold Medal Winner, Album, Kaleidoscope Eyes: Music of The Beatles, 2016
- Global Music Awards Gold Medal Winner, Innovation In Sound, Kaleidoscope Eyes: Music of The Beatles, 2016
- Global Music Awards Gold Medal Winner, Sound Mixing/Editing, Kaleidoscope Eyes: Music of The Beatles, 2016
- IAMA Songwriting Award, "Little Black Spider", 2012
- Global Music Awards, Best in Show, Junk Wagon: The Big Band Album, 2011
- Global Music Awards, Awards of Excellence for Creativity/Originality, Junk Wagon: The Big Band Album, 2011
- Global Music Awards, Awards of Excellence for Album Production, Junk Wagon: The Big Band Album, 2011
- Mellon Award for Excellence in Mentoring, Nomination, University of Southern California, 2010
- Jazz Studies Department Award, University of Southern California, 2009
- Semi-Finalist, Thelonious Monk Institute of Jazz, Jazz Trumpet Competition, 1998
- Second, International Trumpet Guild Carmine Caruso Jazz Soloist Competition, 1998
- Winner, International Trumpet Guild Jazz Soloist Competition, 1994
- Winner, National Trumpet Competition, 1993
- Performance Award, Herb Alpert Award 1991
- Performance Award, Italian Heritage Award 1991
