= Mists: Charles Ives for Jazz Orchestra =

Mists: The Music of Charles Ives for Jazz Orchestra

Studio album by Various artists Jack Cooper
- Released: 22 August 2014
- Recorded: 4 and 6 of April 2014
- Studios: Systems Two, Brooklyn New York; Lighthouse Recording, Staten Island New York
- Genres: Jazz; big band; instrumental
- Length: 55:59
- Label: Planet Arts
- Producers: Thomas Bellino (exec. prod.); Luis Bonilla (main prod. for recording session, contractor, mix down); Douglas Purviance (assoc. prod.)

Jack Cooper chronology
The Chamber Wind Music of Jack Cooper (2010)	Mists: The Music of Charles Ives for Jazz Orchestra (2014)	Time Within Itself (2015)

Mists: Charles Ives for Jazz Orchestra is a jazz album produced by Planet Arts Recordings and released in August 2014. The recording is centered on Charles Ives' art song arranged for 17-piece jazz orchestra by composer Jack Cooper; this is a Third stream approach to jazz made more widely known by earlier band leaders and composers such as Paul Whiteman, Gunther Schuller, George Russell and Don Sebesky. The album is archived in both the United States Library of Congress and the Deutsche Nationalbibliothek as a historically significant sound recording.

Noted Ives scholar Gayle Magee writes,"These recordings preserve the essence of (Ives) classics...while offering a fresh, modern reinterpretation for Ives fans and jazz enthusiasts alike." The album was named as one of the Top 10 Jazz CDs for 2014 in the Chicago Tribune by music critic Howard Reich and also peaked at #8 in radio airplay in the Roots Music Report for top albums in Canada for October 26, 2014. Reich comments about the CD, "Can the gnarly, rhythmically complex, densely scored works of Ives be transformed (sic)? ...arranger Cooper accomplishes it brilliantly, applying a jazz aesthetic to Ives classics..."

== Background ==
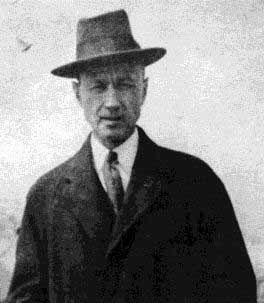
Charles Ives in 1913.

=== Hearing Ives for the first time ===
Jack Cooper grew up in a musical household in the greater Los Angeles area. His mother (Georgie Cooper) was a professional keyboardist, and numerous musicians visited their house to rehearse and give recitals; his Godfather (Robert Voris) was one of those. Voris was one of the first vocal soloists (baritone) with the William Hall Master Chorale in the late 1950s and at one point recorded a LP of classical art song with his mother in October 1963, just 5 months after Cooper was born. Many works were recorded for the LP to include Charles Ives' songs. The Ives titles recorded on the master tapes were The Greatest Man, Serenity, Evening and Charlie Rutlage. This sound became normal for Cooper to hear at home. He heard Ives' songs performed for about 10 years until both his mother and Voris were too busy to perform regular recitals together any longer.

=== Ives music played in school ===
During the 1980s Cooper heard and played the works of Charles Ives in music school, such as the Country Band March, The Unanswered Question, The Camp-Meeting, and his other symphonies. Cooper worked professionally as a full-time jazz musician for about 6 years before attending the University of Texas at Austin to complete a doctorate in music composition. By that time he had also gained experience as a professional staff writer, working on jazz orchestral pieces. Cooper enjoyed writing for large jazz groups, composing pieces like his predecessors Fletcher Henderson, Ellington, Basie, Gil Evans, etc. At one point while living in New York City, Cooper studied with the jazz composer Manny Albam; Albam would later encourage Cooper's pursuit of the Mists/Ives jazz orchestra project.

=== Ives songs made into dissertation ===
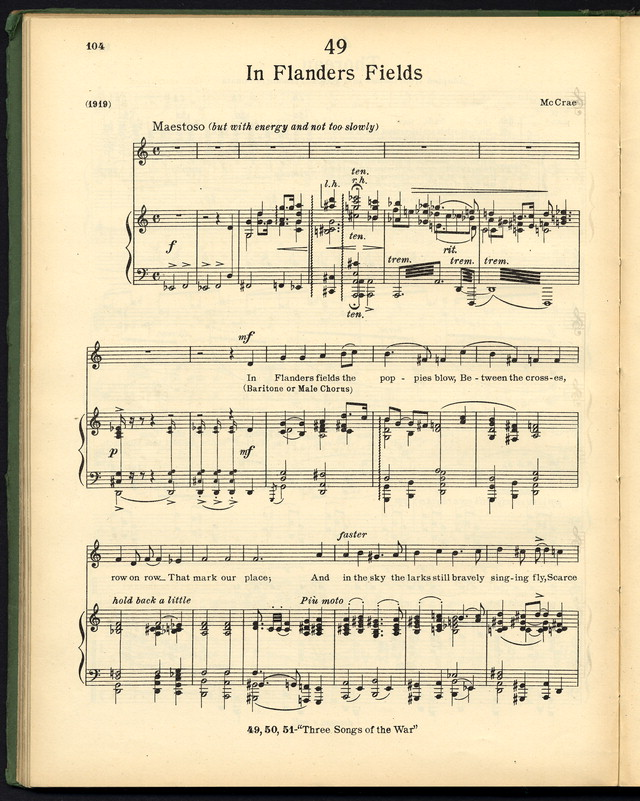
114 Songs of Charles Ives was the main song book used for the Mists project, over 160 songs were on a master list.

Cooper first attended classes at the UT Austin in late 1995; one of those was with musicologist Elliott Antokoletz. In Antokoletz' book Twentieth Century Music (Prentice Hall), Chapter 7 is devoted to music in the United States and specifically Charles Ives is analyzed for 10 pages. Elliott Antokoletz uses Ives' The Cage as a key departure point. The Cage ended up becoming the first of the Ives works Cooper arranged for jazz orchestra; an experiment on how to use more disparate 'Americana' material to arrange and orchestrate rather than typical 'tin pan alley' songs. Cooper's arrangements preserve Ives' work while undergoing a transformation to a jazz aesthetic, "...(the) unexpected places we hear in jazz, and wanna' hear in jazz."

In 1997 Cooper undertook a dissertation project to find music suitable for jazz orchestra that would push the boundaries of how to orchestrate in that idiom. This was a Third Stream approach of melding a prominent American classical composer with the idiom of full 17 piece jazz orchestra. Charles Ives music was decided upon due to the composer's distinctly American style and approach to melodically and harmonically challenging material. The fundamental idea was to use Ives’ “vocal lieder” written for piano and voice much the way arrangers have used songs of Cole Porter, George Gershwin, or Duke Ellington as the inspiration for large jazz orchestra source material (his most basic ideas). Over 160 songs of Ives songs were considered and a master list was derived from numerous volumes of song collections, the Complete Songs of Charles Ives (in four volumes) were used as the primary audio reference. The lengthy process of making master lists and doing study of many Ives’ songs was vital to eventually completing the Mists album. The first three works used in that dissertation were The Cage, The Last Reader and Tom Sails Away; the work is listed as a noted text in both "Charles Ives: A Guide to Research" and "A Charles Ives omnibus". Cooper's orchestrations of The Cage and Tom Sails Away were also recorded on CDs by university jazz ensembles. These would later become studio demo recordings for record labels. Both the Mists recording and treatise are housed in the University of Texas Libraries for artists and researchers.

In mid-January 1998 a visit was made by Cooper to the Gilmore Music Library at Yale University in New Haven, CT in order to study the archives of Charles Ives’ music; the original manuscripts with Ives hand written notes and corrections. At that time Cooper also met with noted Ives scholar James Sinclair. A great deal of important information and analysis was obtained that would help complete both the dissertation and writing of the rest of the five works for the Mists album.

=== Charles Ives jazz orchestra recording ===
In 2000 the idea came about to do an entire CD of Charles Ives works for jazz orchestra to be completed with the Summit Jazz Orchestra in Munich, Germany. Due to lack of funding the project fell through but the whole album of eight of Ives songs arranged for a jazz orchestra had been completed by Cooper. Although there were setbacks, a meeting with Bob Brookmeyer during this time was very encouraging with the legendary composer giving his approval of Cooper's scores. Executive producer Thomas Bellino with Planet Arts Recordings become very interested in the recording project and approached Cooper for the permission to produce the CD late in 2002. An initial grant from the Aaron Copland Fund For Recorded Music was obtained for $10,000 but numerous difficulties with copyrights and production costs had to be worked out which prolonged the recording timeline. Finally in November 2013, Jack Cooper met with longtime friend and musical collaborator Luis Bonilla; the project moved ahead with Bonilla as producer, contractor and musician.

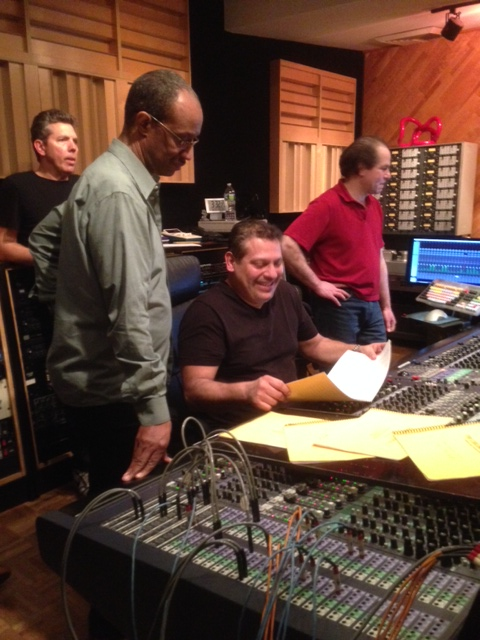
Andy McKee, Douglas Purviance, Luis Bonilla, and Michael Marciano listening to playback at Systems II Recording Studio in Brooklyn, N.Y. on April 4th, 2014 for Mists: Charles Ives for Jazz Orchestra CD.

For the recording Bonilla drew players from three high profile jazz orchestras in New York City: Vanguard Jazz Orchestra, The Afro Latin Jazz Orchestra and the Mingus Dynasty Big Band. Bonilla was careful to contract musicians that both had high level skills as ensemble players as well as being some of the most adept and known jazz soloists in New York. The demanding level of the music and solo spaces proved required this; there was limited time to rehearse and record the entire CD during April 2–6 of 2014. The CD was recorded by a full jazz orchestra (live, no overdubs) on April 4, 2014, at Systems Two Recording in Brooklyn, New York, with extra recording of two solos by trumpeter Terell Stafford completed on April 6 at Lighthouse Recording on Staten Island. Grammy award winning sound engineers Mike Marciano and Ed Reed were used for the recording, editing, mixing and mastering.

The remainder of the budget needed ($18,750) was obtained through the crowd funding site Indiegogo during a highly successful campaign during 25 days in June 2014. As part of that fundraising initiative a category of pledges was developed to lend an important educational aspect to production and support of the project. A donor gave $3000 (part of the Indiegogo) in order to have Cooper visit the University of Northern Iowa campus on April 8–10, 2015, and work with the jazz ensemble in the School of Music. Five of the Mists/Ives jazz orchestra works were performed as well as a new work that was commissioned from Cooper for the group.

=== Album cover and design ===
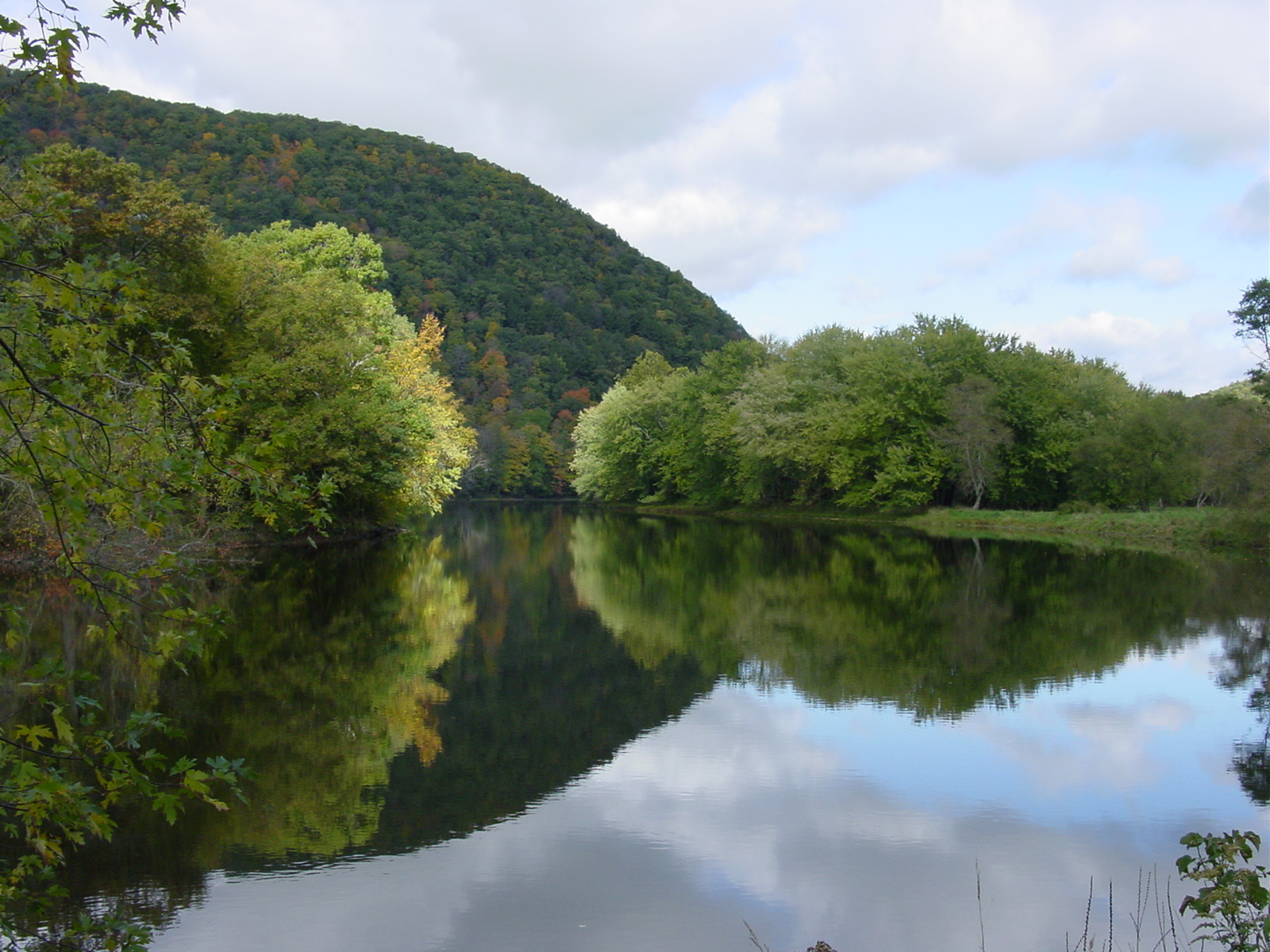
The Housatonic River, inspiration for the Mists: Charles Ives for Jazz Orchestra album cover

Special note is to be taken in consideration of the album design due to its significance to Charles Ives and his catalogue of works. While in the process of producing the Mists album artwork and design during the summer of 2014, Executive producer Thomas Bellino and his wife Terry Lamacchia (professional photographer) ventured north to the Housatonic River near Stockbridge, Massachusetts. Early in the morning several cover photographs were taken for the CD package allowing for a 'Mist' to be available early at sunrise over the Housatonic River. The cover is entitled "The Housatanic at Stockbridge" taken in the mid-summer of 2014, directly related to the Charles Ives' work and the third movement of Three Places in New England.

There is a Man living in this country - a composer. He has solved the problem of how to preserve one's self and to learn...his name is Ives.

— Arnold Schönberg, 1944, after migrating to Los Angeles, quote as part of the Mists liner notes

Great care was taken by the design firm of Philip Pascuzzo (Pepco Studios) in Albany, New York, to integrate the overall album design into the cover artwork. The austere colors of forest green, gray, black and white perfectly match the vision the album producers/artists were aiming for with the release of Mists. When submitted by Mr. Pascuzzo, unanimous approval was given by Bellino, Bonilla and Cooper. The liner notes were composed and edited by professional technical writer Sarah Cooper Douglas. The notes outline the program and include a famous quote about Ives from the expressionist Austrian composer and painter Arnold Schönberg. Along with Ives, Cooper closely studied the musical works of Schönberg and Alban Berg.

== The individual works from MISTS ==
=== "Mists" ===
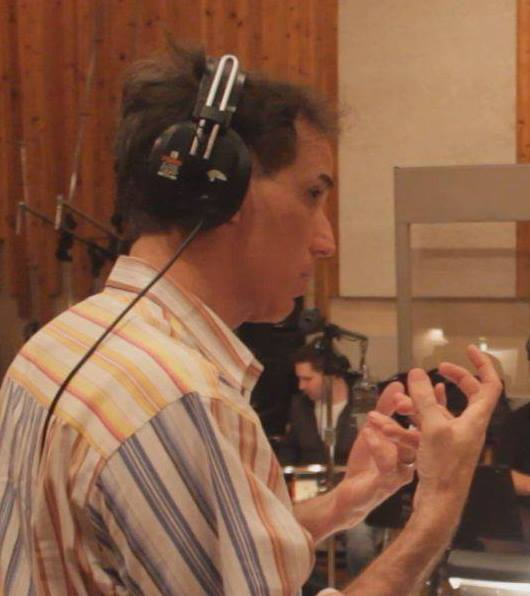
Cooper conducting the Mists recording session on April 4, 2014

Of all eight Ives original songs, "Mists" is the shortest, with "The Cage" a close second. The implications are a great deal of material was developed based on only a very few melodic, harmonic, and rhythmic ideas. References can be heard to Dee Barton's writing he did for Stan Kenton and some of Thad Jones writing for his own jazz orchestra; a mix of the two. A comparison can be made to Beethoven's Sinfonia Eroica being so complex but only using a simple E♭ major triad; Mists consists of only two whole-tone scales, a small chord stream, and a simple major triad to end. The arrangement was developed from only little musical material.

=== "The Last Reader" ===
"The Last Reader" is a more traditional setting that was one of the less complicated Ives arrangements to complete. It is set in three-quarter time. The arranger borrows Ives' idea of having two groups playing at once in harmonic and rhythmic conflict; this is on the front and back of the arrangement. The song itself is one of Ives' longer ones and is rich in harmonic material; Cooper's work is a huge exercise in new chord colors achieved for a large jazz ensemble using Ives' language.

=== "The Children's Hour" ===
From the outset Cooper leaves "The Children's Hour" alone as much as possible. It is a complete piece that Ives based on the Henry Wadsworth Longfellow poem; the harmonic and rhythmic language of Ives needed to be kept intact. Ives' original worked very well but is put to an Ahmad Jamal, Poinciana type of jazz feel. "The Children's Hour" was also inspired by the music of Manny Albam, whom Cooper had studied with in New York during the early 1990s.

=== "Tom Sails Away" ===
The longest and most complex of all Ives' works chosen for the recording was "Tom Sails Away". The harmonic and rhythmic ideas used are jazz and fusion but the formal layout is borrowed strictly from classical music, modified from the 14th-century French Rondeau poetry form. It is transformed into a huge Rondo due to Ives' use of separate vignettes to tell the story contained within the entire song.

=== "The Camp Meeting" ===
The Camp-Meeting shows up in Ives' catalogue in several forms. Regardless of which you are familiar with, the opening and closing of the work have a traditional American brass band sound. The middle of the arrangement is converted into a bossa nova and again was an exercise in new harmonic concepts taken from Ives' work.

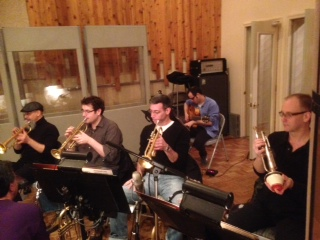
Trumpet section for Mists, l-r Jim Seeley, Nick Marchione, John Walsh and Scott Wendholt

=== "Watchman" ===
Ives had a love for American hymns and transforming them into his own work. Watchman! is originally a Christmas hymn written by Boston choirmaster Lowell Mason in 1830. Undoubtedly this is a hymn Ives played as an organist in Danbury, Connecticut, in the late 1800s; he made it his own. His mixing of tonalities is recognizable throughout the work; Cooper uses Ives' devices and makes this into a more uptempo jazz waltz.

=== "At the River" ===
Again, Ives fondness for religious hymns shows up in "(Shall We Gather) At the River". It resonated for Cooper because of hearing his mother play this for church services on the organ (Cooper was her page-turner many times as a child). Like Ives, Cooper wanted a feeling of familiarity and newness all at once --- having the hymn tune, though familiar, emerge as a new idea; more striking and "swinging" rather than its original context.

=== "The Cage" ===
"The Cage" is the very first of the eight written; ironically, many consider this to be the tour de force of the recording. This contains many influences to generate compositional ideas from such a small but important Ives work. All the way from Bob Brookmeyer to Arnold Schoenberg and all in between; many other composers can be traced in the arrangement. The small piece morphs into a 24-measure minor blues and then moves away leaving the listener hanging much like the philosophical question asked in the original Ives tune..."is life anything like that?" An interesting aside is the B3 organ heard on The Cage is the same instrument used on the famous 1968 pop hit "In-A-Gadda-Da-Vida".

== Promotion ==
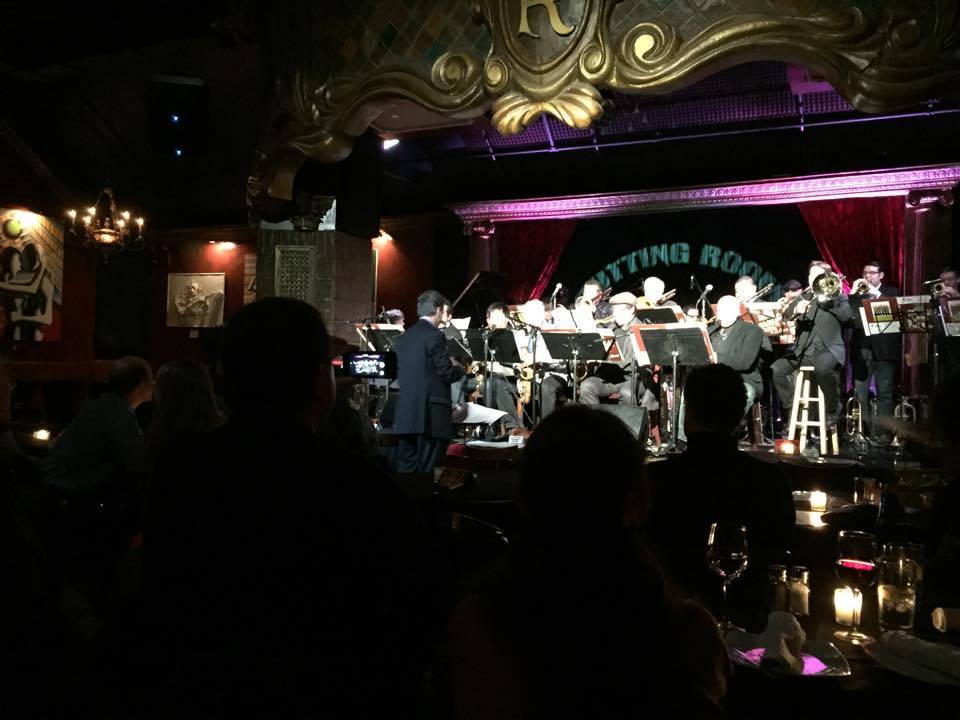
November 12, 2014, premiere of Mists CD in New York City at the Cutting Room

The first unveiling of the Mists: Charles Ives for Jazz Orchestra CD was to a Memphis NARAS chapter audience on June 26, 2014, at the Stax Museum. The track played that evening was Watchman! and received a very favorable reception. The official CD release for the recording occurred on August 22, 2014, and publicity was handled by Two for the Show Media. The music from the entire CD was performed live for a CD premiere concert in New York at The Cutting Room on November 12, 2014. Planet Arts Records submitted the Mists CD into the first round of the 57th Annual Grammy Awards for the categories of Best Arrangement Instrumental or a Cappella, Best Large Jazz Ensemble Album, Best Improvised Jazz Solo, and Producer of the Year, Non-Classical. The media firm Two For The Show was hired to handle all forwarding and promotion of media for the Mists album.

== Critical reception and professional ratings ==
Professional ratings
Review scores
Source	Rating
100 Best Albums of 2014; Ted Gioia	HONORABLE MENTION
All About Jazz	Best Recordings of 2014 #10 of top 12 read reviews of 2014 #1 of top 12 "Most Recommended" reviews of 2014
BBC Radio 3	Jazz Line-Up; Playlist
Chicago Tribune; Baltimore Sun; Glendale News-Press (L.A.)	Highly favorable Top 10 Jazz Recordings for 2014
Commercial Appeal	4/4 stars
The Daily News	Highly favorable
Fidelity	Feature article
International Association of Jazz Record Collectors; IAJRC Journal	Highly favorable
Jazz Journal	4/5 stars
Jazz Podium	Highly favorable
Jazz Reader	4.5/5 stars
Jazz Society of Oregon	Highly favorable
Jazz Weekly	Highly favorable
JazzLife Magazine	Highly favorable
JazzScan	Highly favorable
JazzTimes (2)	Highly favorable
KPOO San Francisco; AVOTCJA’s BEST OF FOR 2014	#12
LA Jazz Scene; Scott Yanow	Highly favorable
London Jazz News	Highly favorable
Midwest Record	Highly favorable
The Nashville Musician	Highly favorable
O's Place Jazz Newsletter	4/5 stars
Rate Your Music	4.5/5 stars
Roots Music Report's top 100 Jazz Album Chart for 2014	#88
Tom Hull; Best Jazz Albums of 2014	B+(*)
WDCB Chicago	Highly favorable

The vast majority of reviews from critics, Ives aficionados and educators for Mists: Charles Ives for Jazz Orchestra were highly favorable. Most all reviews recognize the recording as new territory sought, expanding the musical repertoire for large jazz ensembles. Howard Reich of the Chicago Tribune placed it #2 of the list of 10 top Jazz Recordings of 2014 writing, "Mists not only does justice by Ives but emerges as one of the most beautiful large-ensemble jazz recordings of the year to date."

…This is a fun, exciting recording and one of the most creative big band projects of the year.

— Ted Gioia

Well known author and music critic Ted Gioia recognized the CD on his lists of notable recordings for 2014, “I always suspected that Charles Ives had the makings of a great jazz composer…This is a fun, exciting recording and one of the most creative big band projects of the year.” Noted Ives biographer Gayle Magee, and president of the Charles Ives Society understood the impact of bringing Ives forward to new audiences, "...this CD…presents innovative, exciting arrangements of several of Ive's most popular songs for jazz orchestra. These recordings preserve the essence of classics like 'Mists,' 'The Cage,' and 'At the River' while offering a fresh, modern reinterpretation for Ives fans and jazz enthusiasts alike." Critic Roland Schmenner (Fidellty HiFi und Musik Zeitschrift, Germany) details the extensive background of the Third Stream approach in his feature article from April 8, 2016. He goes onto compliment the recording, "In addition to the phenomenal ‘Groove’ recording, especially intriguing is the peculiar sound aesthetic obtained from Ives'. In short: The Third Stream lives."

Internationally the recording gained high praise with critics in the United Kingdom, Germany and Japan. Jazz Journal's Anthony Troon postulated on the reaction of Ives' himself to the music, giving the CD 4 out of 5 stars, "Presumably Ives never heard modern jazz but he would surely have been intrigued and impressed by this." Again the significance of Ives music brought forward is recognized by Jazz Podium’s Tobias Böcker (translation), "...regardless of the (Ives) title, the listening time/music of the CD allows for big band jazz with a very happy, non-pedantic vitality, with great clarity and open musicality." While the vast majority or reactions were very positive, the music and media critic Tom Hull found the recording lacking, "big band Charles Ives, postmodern but third stream only in that it could use some swing."

The recording has gained notoriety among composers to include Scott Healy who wrote an extensive blog entry outlining the significance of the work and provides analysis of one of the Ives adaptations. Noted composer for the Stan Kenton Orchestra, Mark Taylor and 2014 Grammy nominated composer Dave Slonaker both highly praised the CD at the time of its release.

=== Musicians: soloists on "Mists" ===
One of the clear strengths of the "Mists" recording recognized by critics is the "live, in studio" interaction of the band with soloists. Frank Griffith of the London Jazz News remarks, "...Top solos abound from the likes of Billy Drewes and Ivan Renta on saxophone, trumpeter Jim Seeley, pianist, Randy Ingram as well as veteran VJO lead trombonist, John Mosca." The vast majority of writers recognize the spontaneity of each soloist and how each capture the feeling and purpose of the music. Anthony Troon of the U.K. Jazz Journal gives an overall impression of soloists and ensemble fitting together seamlessly, "...most convincingly carried this thought to its logical conclusion with this ensemble...with virtuoso jazz trumpeter Terell Stafford as guest soloist. ...linking solo, duet and trio passages fits naturally to the composer’s melodic invention, with intriguing changes of color and mood." George Harris of Jazz Weekly recognizes other important soloists and individual efforts made by key players, "...Panoramic themes are able to swing on Mists which also includes rich solos by Stafford and Evan Renta/ts. A bluesy cadence feels right (on At The River) with Luis Bonilla’s trombone...you even get some smoky B3 (Randy Ingram) on The Cage, with Vince Cherico driving the band with his drums like a scene from Ben Hur."

=== Disc jockeys and radio airplay ===
While the Mists recording endeavored to meld the classical modernist Charles Ives into the "modern jazz world", jazz disc jockeys and stations were somewhat divided in giving airplay to the album. When following up with D.J.s It was reported by the media company Two For The Show, some stations and program managers did not know what to do with the CD. For several, seeing the Ives name meant “classical” and they sent it to the classical D.J. (being an NPR programmer) or never attempted to hear the CD or program with a misunderstanding of what the music was all about.

Even with misunderstandings by certain radio stations, Mists did well in major markets in the United States; most notably New York, Chicago, and San Francisco. Initial programming on Chicago’s WDCB.FM “New Releases Spotlight” reveals, “...Mists gets my pick for big band album of the year. …these songs are simply breathtaking.” Award winning Bay area jazz disc jockey Bradley Stone noted, "...what a gorgeous CD! …Candidate for 'record of the year' in my book!" Mists charted for 18 weeks during the Fall and Winter of 2014/2015 having peaked in the #59 slot in the U.S. (week of October 6, 2014).

Internationally the recording had its most favorable airplay and ratings premiering at the #8 slot in Canada of all albums (all genres) for the week of October 26, 2014. ”Watchman” (track 6) was also chosen for the BBC Radio 3 Jazz Line for the week of November 1, 2014, giving the album significant visibility in the U.K. during that time. The jazz disc jockey Jan Johansen of Riviera FM in Torbay, England, continues to regularly feature the recording on his ‘The Arrangers Touch’ show on Sunday evenings. It also continues to be a regularly played release on the KMHD Jazz Radio 89.1 FM (NPR, Oregon) into 2016 for jazz D.J. Carlton Jackson on his Sunday evening show, The Message.

=== Further concerts and legacy ===
Subsequent performances of the music from the Mists CD have been made by the University or Northern Iowa Jazz Band One and the Lansing Symphony Orchestra Jazz Band. October 13, 2018, the North Carolina Jazz Repertory Orchestra presented music from the Mists CD at the James and Susan Moeser Auditorium in Hill Hall on the University of North Carolina Chapel Hill campus.

Accentus Music (Leipzig) produced on an hour long television special about Charles Ives for Arte/WDR in Germany; The Unanswered Ives - Pioneer in American Music. Among many other experts on Charles Ives, the documentary features The Cage from the Mists CD and an interview with Jack Cooper. The film is directed and produced by award winning documentary director Anne-Kathrin Peitz. The show premiered on September 22, 2019, on the Arte Television network.

== Track listing ==
All tracks are written by Charles Ives, all selections arranged and adapted for jazz orchestra by Jack Cooper.

No.	Title	Length
1.	"Mists"	6:14
2.	"The Last Reader"	7:30
3.	"The Children's Hour"	8:08
4.	"Tom Sails Away"	8:08
5.	"The Camp Meeting"	6:51
6.	"Watchman!"	5:01
7.	"At The River"	6:16
8.	"The Cage"	7:56

== Recording Sessions ==
- April 4, 2014 (17 piece ensemble)
- April 6, 2014 (extra recording, Terell Stafford only)

Recorded at Systems Two Studio in Brooklyn, New York, and Lighthouse Recording in Staten Island, New York.

== Personnel ==
=== Musicians ===
- Contractor: Luis Bonilla
- Assistant contractor: Frank Cohen
- Conductor, composer: Jack Cooper
- Alto Saxophone: Billy Drewes, Andrew Halchak
- Tenor Saxophone: Ivan Renta, Peter Brainin
- Baritone Saxophone: Chris Karlic
- Trumpet and flugelhorn: Nick Marchione (lead), John Walsh, Jim Seeley, Scott Wendholt, Terell Stafford
- Trombone: John Mosca, Luis Bonilla, Rey David Alejandre, Frank Cohen, Douglas Purviance
- Guitar: Alex Wintz
- Piano: Randy Ingram
- Bass: Andy McKee
- Drums: Vincent Cherico

=== Production ===
- Executive producer: Thomas Bellino
- Producer: Luis Bonilla
- Associate producer: Douglas Purviance
- Librarian and music coordinators: Frank Cohen and Andy McKee
- Recording engineers (April 4): Michael and Joseph Marciano at Systems Two Recording
- Recording engineer (April 6): Edward Reed at Lighthouse Recording
- Mixing engineer and mastering: Edward Reed at Lighthouse Recording
- Liner notes: Jack Cooper and Sarah Cooper Douglas
- Cover Photo: The Housatonic at Stockbridge by Terry Lamacchia
- Art/Design: Philip Pascuzzo

== Charts ==
Year	Chart	Type	Song/Album	Peak position	Chart date
2014	Roots Music Report - Jazz Albums	Album	Mists: Charles Ives for Jazz Orchestra	18	November 4, 2014
2014	Roots Music Report - Top Albums	Album	Mists: Charles Ives for Jazz Orchestra	8	October 26, 2014
2014	JazzWeek Airplay Reporting	Album	Mists: Charles Ives for Jazz Orchestra	59	October 6, 2014

== Release history ==
Region	Date	Label	Format
Canada	October 28, 2014	Planet Arts Records	CD, digital download
United Kingdom	October 28, 2014	Planet Arts Records	CD, digital download
Japan	August 22, 2014	Planet Arts Records	CD, digital download
United States	August 22, 2014	Planet Arts Records	CD, digital download

== See also ==
- 114 Songs: Postface by Charles Ives
- Planet Arts Records
- Charles Ives
- Jack Cooper
- List of jazz arrangers
- Third Stream
