= Jack Cooper (American musician) =

American composer, arranger, orchestrator, multireedist, and music educator

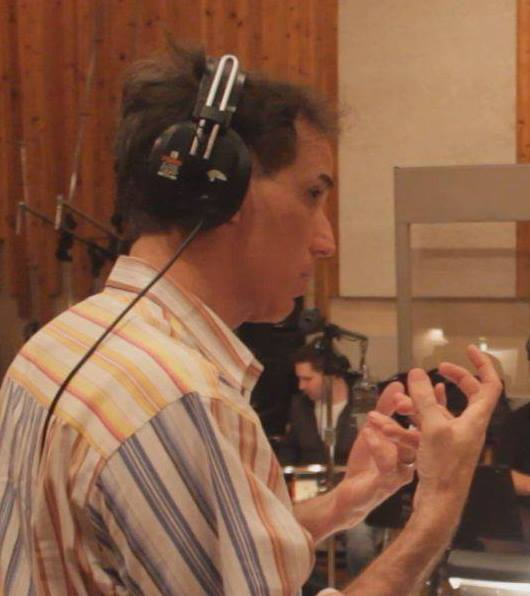
- Conducting the Mists recording session April 4, 2014

Background information
- Born: John Thomas Cooper, Jr. May 14, 1963 (age 63); Whittier, California, U.S.
- Origin: La Habra, California, U.S.
- Genres: Jazz; Classical; Pop
- Occupations: Musician; composer; arranger; orchestrator; conductor; music director; record producer; educator
- Instruments: Saxophone; Clarinet; Flute
- Years active: 1981–present
- Labels: Centaur; Origin; Planet Arts Select-O-Hits; Summit SkyDeck
- Website
- Military career
- Allegiance: United States
- Branch: United States Army
- Service years: 1989–1995
- Rank: Staff Sergeant
- Unit: USMA Band

Jack Cooper (born John Thomas Cooper Jr., May 14, 1963) is an American composer, arranger, orchestrator, multireedist, and music educator. He has performed with, written music for and recorded by internationally known pop, jazz, and classical artists.

== Intro ==
Cooper has performed with, written music for or recorded by internationally known pop, jazz, and classical artists including Sean Ardoin, Aaron Neville, Marc Secara, Jiggs Whigham, the Berlin Jazz Orchestra, Markus Burger, Lenny Pickett, Joyce Cobb, the BBB featuring Bernie Dresel, Duffy Jackson, Donald Brown, Young Voices Brandenburg, Jimi Tunnell, Christian McBride, the Westchester Jazz Orchestra, the U.S.A.F. Airmen of Note, the U.S. Army Jazz Ambassadors, the Dallas Winds, and the Memphis Symphony Orchestra.

== Early life, musical education and influences ==
Jack Cooper was born in Whittier, California on May 14, 1963; his given birth name passed down from his great-grandfather and father, John Thomas Cooper. He was raised in the nearby, northeastern section of La Habra (remote, Southeastern base of the Puente Hills). He is the younger brother of artist and stylist Cathy Cooper, grandson of H.V. Cooper and also the grandson (x4) of Harriet Byron McAllister His mother, Georgie Cooper, was an accomplished classical pianist; his Godfather Robert Voris was a well known baritone-bass vocal soloist. Cooper's father was an amateur clarinet and sax player who gave Cooper his first instruments. He was first inspired by clarinetist Artie Shaw at age eleven, he soon was taken by Charlie Parker heard from 78's; he learned flute in college.

After graduating from Sonora High School and having first studied with Ernie Del Fante, Cooper attended Fullerton College where he studied composition and arranging with Tom Ranier and saxophone with Dave Edwards and Don Raffell (later studied with Peter Yellin in New York). While at Fullerton College he recorded on the Down Beat award-winning LP, Time Tripping. He later transferred to California State University, Los Angeles where he received a BA in Music education and clarinet in 1987. Cooper also studied jazz composition with composers Bob Curnow and David Caffey. "Since college, when I first began studying big band musical arrangements, (I) wanted to orchestrate for jazz ensembles." Two years later he completed a MA in composition at C.S.U.L.A. and had studied with Byong-Kon Kim, George Heussenstamm and William H. Hill. He has collaborated closely on several professional projects with CSULA classmate Luis Bonilla. Early on in Cooper's life he started experiencing acute Synesthesia/Chromesthesia which would become an important part of his process to composing and arranging music.

Later composition studies were with David Baker, Gerald Wilson, Manny Albam, Karl Korte, and Richard Lawn; in 1999 he earned a DMA in composition from the University of Texas at Austin.

His first notable professional work in Los Angeles as a multireedist was with the Kingsmen, Shari Lewis, Mateos Parseghian, the Tak Shindo Orchestra, Si Zentner, Steve Jam, the Dive, and the Last Mile.

== Armed forces and the West Point Jazz Knights ==
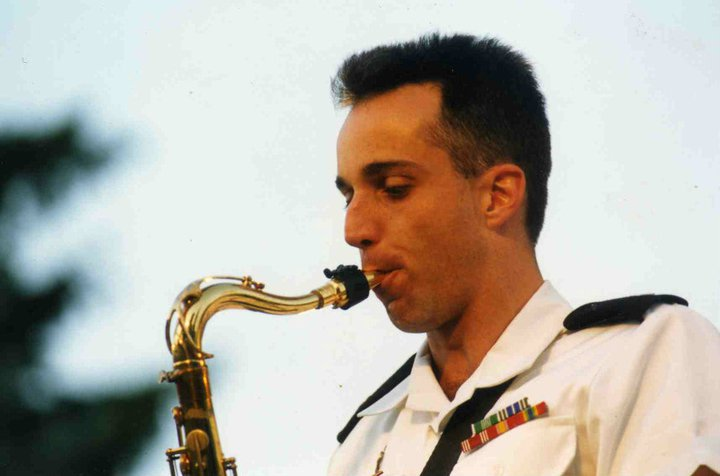
Cooper on a tour with the Jazz Knights, Branford, CT., June 1994

At age 25 (in 1989) Cooper was hired as a saxophonist/woodwind doubler and staff arranger for the United States Army Jazz Knights, a premier musical ensemble of the United States Armed Forces. For 6 years he toured, performed, wrote for and recorded extensively with the West Point Band's musical group to include A&E television appearances at the Hatch Memorial Shell with the Boston Pops, jazz festivals across the Northeastern United States, backing entertainers and jazz artists. He participated in the funeral of former President Richard M. Nixon in April 1994.

While in New York he worked extensively backing entertainers and artists such as Tony Martin, The Lettermen, Clint Holmes, Fred Travalena, Dennis Wolfberg, and worked as arranger and saxophonist with the band Alma Latina. Cooper was introduced by composer Carl Strommen during this time to Columbia Pictures Publishing/Belwin and Warner Bros.; Double Helix was the first of many works published.

== Professional career ==
=== As instrumentalist ===
Cooper has played woodwind instruments professionally since the 1980s. His work includes backing Jennifer Holliday, Kenny Rogers, Macy Gray, Manhattan Transfer, Glen Campbell, Mitch Ryder (and Detroit Wheels), Chris Stamey and playing woodwinds on national tours for the Producers, Sweet Charity, and A Chorus Line. He has played in saxophone sections for the Tommy Dorsey Orchestra, the Guy Lombardo Orchestra, the Temptations and on the CD Coming Through Slaughter: The Bolden Legend. He has also been a featured guest artist/soloist at the Western States Jazz Festival, the Birmingham International Jazz and Blues Festival (U.K.), the 45th International Horn Symposium, and the Festival Virtuosi (2007) in Recife, Brazil. Also as a woodwind player, Cooper has been a featured classical artist and soloist with the Hot Springs Festival Orchestra, Memphis Symphony Orchestra, the IRIS Symphony Orchestra, and as a chamber soloist internationally.

=== As composer (highlights) ===
Cooper first writing music professionally in the early 1980s. He was first hired in 1992 as a staff arranger for Columbia Pictures Publishing/Belwin; his television and media music writing credits include The Jenny Jones Show, Danish Radio 2 (DR P2), E! Entertainment shows, Access Hollywood, JBVO: Your All Request Cartoon Show, American Restoration, Deal or No Deal, and Extra. His music has been featured at numerous venues around the world to include the North Sea Jazz Festival and the Montreux Jazz Festival. He is the musical director, composer and chief arranger for the Jazz Orchestra of the Delta; in 2003 they produced the CD Big Band Reflections of Cole Porter. He also serves as the musical director and chief arranger for Kathy Kosins and her show Rhapsody in Boop. In February 2006 Cooper collaborated with choreographer Mark Godden to produce the ballet Two Jubilees commissioned by and for Ballet Memphis. His musical influence on the ballet gained critical acclaim.

Though his catalogue has a great deal of varied music, his work emphasizes the big band genre. His big band writing has been featured with many groups internationally on the professional and educational levels, "...this style of jazz music (sic) is my wheel house of expertise." Two definitive CDs were recorded in 2014 that exemplify Cooper's adeptness as a jazz orchestra composer and arranger: Mists: Charles Ives for Jazz Orchestra and Time Within Itself. Both are recognized internationally as exceptional examples of contemporary, progressive big band composition and orchestration. As a staff composer and arranger, he is featured with the BBB featuring Bernie Dresel on their acclaimed 2022 CD The Pugilist. Cooper serves as Composer in Residence with the Southern California based Big Band Jazz Machine.

==== Chamber and solo works ====
His Sonata for Trombone was commissioned in 1997 and has been widely performed and recorded by trombone artists including Mark Hetzler, Tom Brantley, Lance Green, Chris Buckholtz, and Michael Davidson (among others). The work is recorded on two highly acclaimed recordings for Centaur Records and Summit Records. Cooper's 2nd Sonata for Trombone was completed in 2018 and recorded on the release Synthesis for SkyDeck Music. The Sonata for Alto Saxophone was commissioned for and first premiered in July 2000 at the 12th World Saxophone Congress in Montreal, Canada. It is described as belonging with "such landmark 'jazz/classical' pieces as the Phil Woods Sonata, on any recital or concert program that explores (both) these worlds."

One of the Missing – for those lost in Iraq for euphonium was commissioned in 2007 and premiered in 2008. It is a protest piece that shows the composer's anti-war stance against the Iraq War; the title is taken from the anti-war/Civil War short story and film adaptation of Ambrose Bierce. The work was also used on the soundtrack of a 2011 Canadian television film broadcast on the Vision network. Cooper's Violin Sonata was premiered on May 27, 2018 as part of the Barnstedter Kapellen Konserte series in Barnstedt, Germany; recording of the work for commercial release was on June 26/27 at Greve Studio in Berlin.

==== Berlin, Germany ====
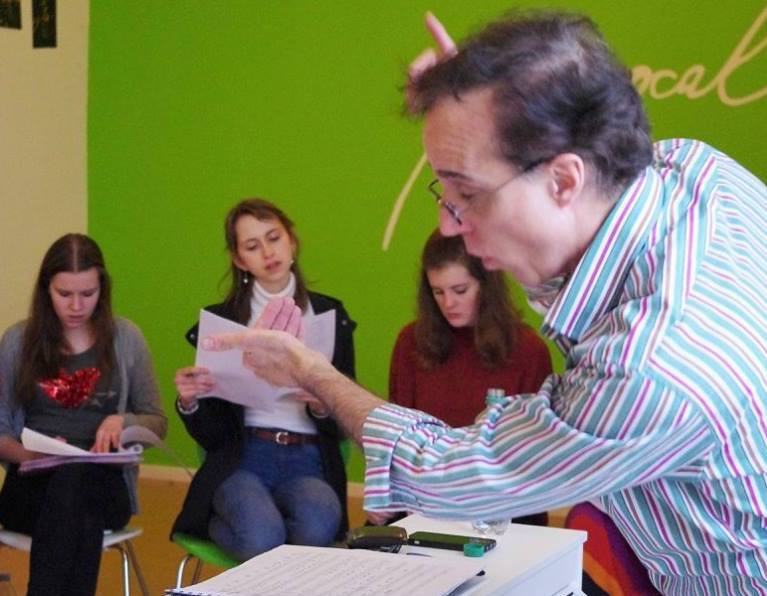
Cooper preparing for recording session with Young Voices of Brandenburg, February 2016

From June 2015 through August 2016 Cooper resided full-time in the Charlottenburg-Wilmersdorf borough of Berlin, Germany and continues to commute between the U.S. and Germany and makes his home in both Schöneberg, Berlin and Memphis, Tennessee. He serves as a staff arranger, musical director and production assistant for Marc Secara and the Berlin Jazz Orchestra for live performances and recording sessions. He also assisted in arranging for the Collegium musicum Potsdam Symphony Orchestra and the Compass Big Band. Cooper has conducted music and performed in venues such at the Wühlmäuse Theater, Heimathafen Neukölln and Kunstfabrik Schlot. He also served as a Visiting professor and Artist-in-residence at the SRH Hochschule der populären Künste and is currently a visiting professor at the Universität Erfurt. He has worked closely with German jazz, pop and Schlager personalities such as Marc Secara, Jiggs Whigham and Marc Marshall. Since 2018, Cooper has collaborated with German, film documentary director Anne-Kathrin Peitz. He is featured on the award winning The Unanswered Ives documentary and is and also featured on the 2022 television documentary about the life and music of composer Paul Dessau.

=== Awards and special recognition ===
Jack Cooper is currently honored as a named professor by the University of Memphis and also the UM College of Communication and Fine Arts: 2025 Faudree Professor and 2025 Rawlins Professor of Music. He was named as the Pearl Wales Professor of Music from the University of Memphis Scheidt School of Music, 2020-22. He was also the 2020 recipient of the University of Memphis CCFA Dean's Creative Achievement Award and the 2010 recipient of the Distinguished Achievement in the Creative Arts Award from the UMAA. He was chosen in 2003 as a nominee for the annual NARAS Premier Player Awards and also was awarded a $10,000 grant from the Aaron Copland Fund for Recording Program in 2003. He is also the recipient of numerous ASCAP composer awards since 1996. As a presenter he has been honored as the key-note speaker for the Modern Language Association, scholar and main presenter for four different National Endowment for the Humanities series on American Music, and the Hawaii International Conference on Arts & Humanities. As conductor of the University of Memphis Jazz Singers, the group was awarded "Outstanding Performance" honors in the notable DownBeat Magazine 48th Annual Student Music Awards.

== Teaching and education career ==
Cooper has been teaching at the collegiate level for over 25 years, earning the rank of Professor. Before his appointment to the University of Memphis as director of jazz studies in 1998, he had taught privately and worked as a clinician for the U.S. Army Jazz Knights. He has served as an invited clinician, guest artist, and conductor in Recife (Brazil), Birmingham (U.K), Berlin Germany, Graz Austria and Bogotá Colombia. He has also served as guest conductor for the Missouri All-State Collegiate Jazz Orchestra and the Arkansas, Arizona, Kentucky All-State High School Jazz Ensembles. From September 2016 through March 2020, Cooper served as host of the WUMR radio program The Voice of Jazz which aired on Wednesday nights from 5-6 P.M. CST. Since 2021, he has served as guest artist with the Erfurt Jazz Project and lecturer at the Universität Erfurt during summer semesters.

== Audio recordings ==
=== As featured artist, composer or producer ===
- 2003: Big Band Reflections of Cole Porter (Summit Records)
- 2004: Memphis Jazz Box (Ice House Records)
- 2007: Voices (Select-O-Hits)
- 2009: Out of the Bluffs (Select-O-Hits)
- 2010: The Chamber Wind Music of Jack Cooper
  (Centaur Records)
- 2014: Mists: Charles Ives for Jazz Orchestra (Planet Arts Records)
- 2015: Time Within Itself (Origin Records)
- 2018: Origin Suite (Origin Records)
- 2021: Songs of Berlin (GAM Music)

=== As composer, arranger, conductor or producer (and instrumentalist on select tracks) ===
- 1985: The New in You (H D C Music Publications)
- 1986: We're Back! (H D C Music Publications)
- 1987: Diversions (H D C Music Publications)
- 1988: Monstrosity! (H D C Music Publications)
- 1990: It's About Time (CSULA 890)
- 1993: The USMA Band (Mark Records DC 1401)
- 1994: Mainstream (JLFC)
- 1996: Jump Shot! (RM 169D)
- 1997: Sixth Floor Jazz (UTJO)
- 1997: Celebration! (FC)
- 1997: Fascinatin' Rhythm (ROPA JAZZ)
- 1998: Games (UNI)
- 1999: Meanwhile... (OCJ Jazz)
- 2000: Once in a Blue Moon (UTJO)
- 2000: Illusion (Benjamino Music)
- 2001: The Eleventh Hour (Seabreeze Jazz)
- 2001 Showcase 2001
- 2002: Up Your Brass (Seabreeze Jazz)
- 2002: Summertime (AJE)
- 2003: Eclectikos (Dekajaz)
- 2003: Standard Deviations (HDCD)
- 2003: Upside Out (Seabreeze-Vista Jazz)
- 2006: Minimal Effort (UNL)
- 2011: Enriching Life With Jazz (JazzMN)
- 2012: Peanuts for Christmas (iTunes, MP3 album)
- 2013: Juletona (Daniel Engen Productions)
- 2014: Sounds of the Season (BlueTom Records)
- 2015: Local Color (UNI)
- 2015: Blues, Ballads and Beyond (Summit Records)
- 2016: Sound of Home (Junge Töne)
- 2016: I Can Do All Things (JWM)
- 2017: Neujahrskonzert (Aktiv Sound Records)
- 2018: Synthesis (SkyDeck Music)
- 2020: Almost Alone (ADC Recordings)
- 2021: Time Frames (Origin Classical)
- 2021: The Pugilist (DIG-IT)
- 2022: Michael Waldrop Collected Works (Origin Records)
- 2022: Crosscurrents (Horen-Schoener Music)
- 2023: Love Never Changes (JWM)
- 2023: Mosaic (Zydekool Records)
- 2024: A Tribute to the Singer Nancy Wilson (Sony-Orchard)
- 2025: Native Son (Origin Records)
- 2025: Scoopin' The Loop (Summit Records)

=== As instrumentalist ===
- 1982: Escape to Asylum (FC/parts re-released with Trend AM PM Records)
- 1983: Classical Expression (FCLP)
- 1983: Time Tripping (Trend AM PM Records)
- 1984: Primarily Jazz (Trend AM PM Records)
- 1985: Unforgettable (Trend AM PM Records)
- 1998: Live at Ringside (OCJ Jazz)
- 2003: Swingopoly (NMH Jazz)
- 2003: Ninety Years of Making Music (UMAA)
- 2009: Coming Through Slaughter: The Bolden Legend (SkyDeck Music)
- 2022: Small Places (CC Music)

== Film, television, DVD, video ==
=== As instrumentalist/actor/interviewed ===
- 1988: Man Against the Mob (television movie, NBC)
- 2005: Mississippi Rising (MSNBC)
- 2010: Why I Chose... (CBS, ESPN)
- 2018: The Unanswered Ives (Accentus Music, Arte)
- 2023: Paul Dessau: Let's Hope For The Best (Yellow Table Media GmbH, Arte)
- 2025: Geeintes Land (Gerd Krambehr, YouTube)

=== As composer/arranger/conductor/musical director ===
- 1995: Twice is Nice (UMG/FirstCom)
- 2008: Candle on the Bluff Awards (PBS, WKNO)
- 2009: Candle on the Bluff Awards (PBS, WKNO)
- 2011: Live at Nine (CBS) WREG
- 2012: The Art Academy (True Story Pictures)

== Published music, books, educational media, articles as author and reviewer ==
- 1995: Double Helix
- 2005: The Greenwood Encyclopedia of African American Folklore (Greenwood Press) – four entries authored
- 2007: Experiencing Jazz (Routledge Publishing) – contributing author for DVD and web content
- 2008: Winter Wonderland (SmartMusic)
- 2008: MTSBOA Jazz Bands 2 CD set (Heartdance Music Inc.)
- 2011: JazzTimes Magazine
- 2012: Perfectly Composed (CD ROM)
- 2014: Practical Music Theory (Kendall Hunt Publishing) – music for chapter 19
- 2019: Composing Jazz (SkyDeck Music) contributing author
- 2025: Louis Armstrong und die DDR, Gerbergasse 18, Ausgabe 3/2025

== Other artists worked with (partial list) ==
- Jason Alexander
- Bob Brookmeyer
- Glen Campbell
- Larry Elgart
- Lesley Gore
- Jennifer Holliday
- Abbey Lincoln
- Tony Martin
- Brian McKnight
- Mulgrew Miller
- James Moody
- Oscar Peterson
- Benny Powell
- Rufus Reid
- Molly Ringwald
- Smokey Robinson
- Ray Romano
- David Sánchez
- Roseanna Vitro
- Nancy Wilson
- The Lettermen
- The Four Tops
- The O'Jays
- The Spinners
- The Shirelles
- The Temptations

== Discography (select, reviewed) ==
Year	Album	Primary artist producer conductor composer arranger instrumentalist	Type	Label	U.S.	Canada	U.K.	Germany	Review Rating
1983	Time Tripping	instrumentalist	Studio	Trend AM PM					Down Beat; 1st Place Winner
1988	Monstrosity!	instrumentalist composer	Studio	# CSULA 888					Los Angeles Times
1994	Mainstream	arranger	Studio/Live	FC					Down Beat
1998	Games	arranger	Studio/Live	UNI					Down Beat best CDs of the 1990s
2003	Big Band Reflections of Cole Porter	Primary artist producer	Studio	Summit	JazzWeek; August 22, 2003 #88		Jazz Journal very positive		All About Jazz
2003	Upside Out	composer (title track)	Studio	Sea Breeze	JazzWeek; February 6, 2004 #164				All Music Guide
2004	Memphis Jazz Box	producer instrumentalist composer arranger	Studio/Live	Icehouse					Commercial Appeal
2009	Coming Through Slaughter: The Bolden Legend	instrumentalist	Studio	SkyDeck		Exclaim! very positive			Down Beat
2010	The Chamber Wind Music of Jack Cooper	Primary artist producer	Studio	Centaur					Fanfare Magazine very positive
2014	Mists: Charles Ives for Jazz Orchestra	Primary Artist	Studio	Planet Arts	JazzWeek; October 6, 2014 #59	Roots Music Report; October 26, 2014 #8	BBC Radio 3 November 1, 2014 playlist choice	Jazz Podium; Highly recommended	All About Jazz Chicago Tribune 2014 Top 10 Jazz
2015	Time Within Itself	composer arranger conductor	Studio	Origin Records	JazzWeek; April 13, 2015 #71		Jazz Journal		All About Jazz
2015	Local Color	composer	Studio	UNI					All About Jazz
2015	Blues, Ballads and Beyond	composer	Studio	Summit		Classical Musical Sentinel very positive			All About Jazz
2016	I Can Do All Things	composer	Studio	JDW Music	Roots Music; Report #4				Amazon 'Vine Voice'
2018	Origin Suite	composer arranger conductor	Studio	Origin Records	JazzWeek; February 26, 2018 #67		Jazz Journal		All About Jazz
2021	The Pugilist	arranger	Studio	Dig-it Records	JazzWeek; March 14, 2022 #23				DownBeat

== See also ==
- List of jazz arrangers
- List of jazz contrafacts
- Jazz Orchestra of the Delta
- Berlin Jazz Orchestra
- List of Concert Works for Saxophone
- Brass Quintet Répertoire
- Euphonium Répertoire
- Clarinet sonata
- Sonata for Trombone (Cooper)
