= Monday Night Live at the Village Vanguard =

Live album by The Vanguard Jazz Orchestra
- Released: 2008
- Venue: Village Vanguard, New York City
- Genre: Jazz, big band
- Length: 92:03
- Label: Planet Arts
- Producer: Douglas Purviance, Thomas Bellino

The Vanguard Jazz Orchestra chronology
| Up from the Skies (2007) | Monday Night Live at the Village Vanguard (2008) | Forever Lasting (2011) |

Monday Night Live at the Village Vanguard is an album by the Vanguard Jazz Orchestra. It won the Grammy Award for Best Large Jazz Ensemble Album in 2009.

Most of the songs and arrangements are by Thad Jones, who founded the group as the Thad Jones/Mel Lewis Orchestra. "Willow Tree" and "St. Louis Blues" were arranged by Bob Brookmeyer, an original member of the group.

== Track listing ==
| No. | Title | Writer(s) | Length |
|---|---|---|---|
| 1. | "Mean What You Say" | Thad Jones | 8:49 |
| 2. | "Say It Softly" | Thad Jones | 6:51 |
| 3. | "St. Louis Blues" | W. C. Handy | 15:50 |
| 4. | "Body and Soul" | Frank Eyton/Johnny Green/Edward Heyman/Robert Sour | 7:09 |
| 5. | "Mornin' Reverend" | Thad Jones | 5:00 |
| 6. | "Loas Cucarachas Entran" | Jim McNeely | 10:07 |
| 7. | "Willow Tree" | Fats Waller | 7:06 |
| 8. | "Don't You Worry 'Bout a Thing" | Stevie Wonder | 4:08 |
| 9. | "Kids Are Pretty People" | Thad Jones | 8:58 |
| 10. | "The Waltz You Swang for Me" | Thad Jones | 5:56 |
| 11. | "Little Rascal on a Rock" | Thad Jones | 12:09 |

== Personnel ==
- Jim McNeely – conductor, piano
- Billy Drewes – alto saxophone, soprano saxophone, clarinet, flute
- Dick Oatts – flute, piccolo, alto saxophone, soprano saxophone
- Ralph Lalama – clarinet, flute, tenor saxophone
- Rich Perry – flute, tenor saxophone
- Gary Smulyan – baritone saxophone
- Douglas Purviance – trombone, producer
- John Mosca – trombone
- Luis Bonilla – trombone
- Jason Jackson – trombone
- Nick Marchione – trumpet
- Frank Greene – trumpet
- Scott Wendholt – trumpet
- Terell Stafford – trumpet, flugelhorn
- John Clark – French horn
- Michael Weiss – piano, arranger
- Phil Palombi – double bass
- John Riley – drums
- Thomas Bellino – producer
- Ed Reed – engineer
- Benjamin Krumholz – engineer
- Rick Rivera – engineer
- Travis Steff – mixing
- Gary Chester – mixing
- Alan Silverman – remastering
