= Local color =

Local color/colour may refer to:

- Local Color (book), a 1950 note and sketch study by Truman Capote
- Local Color (Mose Allison album), 1958
- Local Color (University of Northern Iowa Jazz Band One album), 2015
- Local Color, a 1977 American drama film directed by Mark Rappaport
- Local Color (film), a 2006 American drama film starring Trevor Morgan
- Local color (visual art), the natural color of an object
- Local Colour: Travels in the Other Australia, a 1994 book by Bill Bachman and Tim Winton
- Local Color, a short-story collection by John Andrew Rice
- Local Color, an art exhibition by Tullio DeSantis
- American literary regionalism, also called local color, a style or genre of writing

== See also ==
- Regionalism (disambiguation)
