= Upside Out =

Studio album by Riverside City College Jazz Ensemble and combo
- Released: December 2, 2003
- Recorded: 2002/2003, Riverside, CA; Austin, TX
- Genre: Jazz, big band, instrumental
- Length: 73:44
- Label: Sea Breeze Vista Jazz
- Producer: Charlie Richard

Riverside City College Jazz Ensemble and combo chronology
Upside Out (2003)	Minor Case of the Blues (2010)
- cat. # Sea Breeze Jazz-Vista; SBV 4554

Upside Out is the debut album of the Riverside City College Jazz Ensemble and its combos, released in 2003 under the Sea Breeze Vista Jazz label. The album was distributed to jazz radio stations, where it received airplay on stations across the United States.

== Background ==
The Riverside City College Jazz Ensemble has been a component of the music program at Riverside City College (RCC) for over 40 years. The ensemble stages students in various performance settings: from large bands to smaller combos. The album Upside Out, released in 2003, features the work of both individuals and the collective ensemble.

The RCC Jazz Ensemble has played at numerous events and venues, including the University of Northern Colorado's Greeley Jazz Festival and the University of Texas Jazz Festivals.

In addition to competitive performances, the RCC Jazz Ensemble features guest artist workshops and performances with musicians such as Carl Saunders, James Moody, Bob McChesney, Mike Stern, Poncho Sanchez, and Kim Richmond. New works are commissioned each spring and have been obtained from jazz composers such as Bob Curnow, Jack Cooper—who composed the title track of "Upside Out"—David Caffey, and Matt Harris.

== Recognition ==
The music from the CD was performed multiple times during tours with the RCC Jazz Ensemble, most notably on a concert tour of Japan.

In addition, the RCC Jazz Ensemble performed at events such as the Reno Jazz Festival (where they won first place in the Big Band division in 2010) and the International Association for Jazz Education Convention.

== Reception ==
Professional ratings
Review scores
Source	Rating
Allmusic Guide	4/5 stars
All About Jazz	(very positive)
Jazz Journal International	(very positive)

The CD has received positive attention within the jazz community and was consistently played on jazz radio stations across the United States. Stations such as WBIO in Indiana, WPKN in Connecticut, WAER in New York, KVLU-NPR in Texas, and KSDS in California have included it in their playlists.

== Track listing ==
All tracks are written by individual composers and arrangers.

No.	Title	Length
1.	"Are We There Yet? (Lyle Mays, arr. Bob Curnow)"	6:13
2.	"Upside Out (Jack Cooper)"	9:18
3.	"Widow's Walk (Rick Margitza, arr. Dan Gailey)"	8:36
4.	"The Third Wind, (Lyle Mays and Pat Metheny), arr. Sandy Megas"	11:52
5.	"Seven Eleven (Chris Potter, arr. Paul White)"	7:43
6.	"Bumbershoot (Béla Fleck)"	6:02
7.	"Wondering (Shane Jordan)"	3:50
8.	"Donna Lee (Charlie Parker)"	5:32
9.	"Nasty Dance (Bob Brookmeyer)"	12:38
Total length:		73:43

== Recording sessions ==
- Tracks 1–8 - 2002/2003, recorded at Riverside Community College, in studio.
- Track 9 - 2003 Longhorn Jazz Festival, Austin, Texas, concert performance.

== Personnel ==
=== Musicians ===
- Conductor: Charlie Richard
- Saxophones and woodwinds: Travis Alegria, Kelly Corbin, Ioana Fleming, Jason Jamerson, Demetrius Patin, Bill Preci, Trevor Shiffermiller, James Reinbolt, Jaime Royal, Gerry Whitaker
- Trumpets and flugelhorns: Everardo Aguilar, Kinch Degrate, Paul Karandos, Tatsuya Koyama, Brian Mantz, Don Marino II, Carlos Villa, Kevin Young
- Trombones: Dan Bigler, Diane Bigler, Rick Covarubias, Frank Hickman, Joe Martinez, Marcos Rodriguez, Nicholas Terwilliger, Aaron Wharton
- Guitar: James DePrato, Josh Miller, Erin Von Pingle
- Piano: David Peoples, Erin Von Pingle
- Bass: Bill Dickson, Shane Jordan, Ferrari Watts
- Drums: Jon McCammon, Dan Rocadio, Chad Villarreal
- Percussion: Michael Gaylord, Anna Perotta, Angela Thomas

=== Production ===
- Recording engineer, mixing: Charlie Richard
- Mastering: D.J. Alverson
- Liner notes: David Caffey
- Cover art and graphic design: Joan Rovan Wales

== Charts ==
Year	Chart	Type	Song/Album	Position	Chart Date
2004	JazzWeek Airplay Reporting	Album	Upside Out	164	February 6, 2004

== See also ==
- Riverside City College
