= Double helix (disambiguation) =

The double helix is the structure formed by double-stranded molecules of nucleic acids.

Double helix may also refer to:

== Science and engineering ==
- Double helix (geometry), two helices with the same axis differing by a translation along the axis
- Double Helix Nebula, a gaseous nebula in the Milky Way Galaxy
- Double helical gear, also known as a herringbone gear
- The Helix Bridge, a bridge shaped as the double helix located at the Marina Bay, Singapore, Singapore
- Twisted pair, conductive wires twisted together in a double helix

== Gaming and animation ==
- Double Helix Games, a video game developer
- Soldier of Fortune II: Double Helix, a video game
- Double-Helix, an alien race in the Wing Commander (franchise)
- Doublehelix, a character in the animated film Asterix and the Vikings
- Literal translation of Duet Night Abyss in Chinese

== Literature ==
- The Double Helix, a book about the discovery of the double-helical structure of DNA
- Double Helix (novel), a 2004 novel by Nancy Werlin
- Star Trek: Double Helix, a six-book miniseries and a spinoff of the Star Trek: The Next Generation book series
  - Double Helix: Double or Nothing, a book in the aforementioned series

== Other uses ==
- Double Helix (music composition), a 1991 piece for jazz orchestra by Jack Cooper
- Double Helix (TV series), a 2026 Chinese-Singaporean TV series
- Double Helix (database), a database management system for the Apple Macintosh computer system
- "Double Helix" (The Outer Limits), a 1997 television episode
- Double Helix Corporation, a non-profit media organization in St. Louis, Missouri, US

- "Double Helix", a song by Death Grips from The Money Store
- "Double Helix", a song by Steve Aoki from Hiroquest 2: Double Helix
