= The Pugilist =

Studio album by The BBB featuring Bernie Dresel
- Released: Nov 17, 2021
- Recorded: Spring, 2021
- Venue: Various private studios, Los Angeles
- Studio: Galaxy Studios, Mol, Belgium (Mixing)
- Genre: Jazz; Big band; instrumental
- Length: 1:03:20
- Label: Dig-It Recordings
- Producer: Wilfried Van Baelen, Gary Reber, Bernie Dresel

The BBB featuring Bernie Dresel chronology
"Bern Bern Bern" (2018)	The Pugilist (2021)	"Number One Son" (2025)
- Dig-it Recordings 003

The Pugilist is a 2021 album by The BBB Featuring Bernie Dresel. The recording is the third release from The BBB Featuring Bernie Dresel.

== Background ==
Production of The Pugilist was during the COVID 19 coronavirus pandemic, during most of 2021. Unlike the two earlier BBB releases, recorded with the full band in concert or at Capitol Studios, The Pugilist was recorded without the band ever playing together at the same time. The tracks were recorded separately during the first months of 2021, instrument by instrument from remote locations (self recording). Bernie Dresel’s drums were recorded first, then he overdubbed secondary drum set parts (heard in the rear loudspeakers in surround and Auro-3D); the other instrumental tracks were added to eventually create an edited and mixed master. The others performers recorded to a click track, used to synchronize their tracks to each other. A 'click track' provides the musician with precise beats per minute (bpm) for each tune recorded; the range was from 70 bpm to 280 bpm.

Dresel's drum kit was recorded with 15 microphones, all of the recording were captured at 96-kHz/24-bit resolution. After the tracks were completely recorded, a preliminary mix was enhanced with reverberation and 'room sound', which served as a reference point for the final mixing. Patrick Lemmens loaded all of the individual tracks into Avig Pro Tools and set the mix prior to Dresel and Gary Reber arriving at Galaxy Studios in Belgium. The final mix was achieved by working closely with Wilfried Van Baelen at Galaxy. The album is recorded and mastered in Auro-3D, The Pugilist is also offered on Blu-ray Disc (BD). Auro-3D audio formatting was achieved by adding natural 3D sound reflection of Galaxy Hall in Mol.

== Promotion ==
The Pugilist album was both released and premiered on Wednesday, November 17, 2021 at Herb Alpert's Vibrato Grill & Jazz in the Bel Air, Los Angeles area of Southern California: this performance was also Dresel's 60th ‘Birthday Bash.’ Groov Marketing and consulting is the primary outlet handling the promotion on radio and digital platforms.

== Reception ==
Professional ratings
Review scores
Source	Rating
DownBeat	3.5/5 stars
All About Jazz (album review)	Most Read reviews of 2022
All About Jazz (track review)	4/5 stars
Jazz Weekly	Highly favorable
Sound & Vision	Performance; Sound
Local Spins	BEST OF 2021
O's Place Jazz Newsletter	79/100
Midwest Record	Highly Favorable

"...doesn't let up through the end of an earnest and aggressive session that sets ablaze four well-known standards and ten original compositions including one apiece by Miles Davis, Michael Jackson and Frank Zappa."

- Jack Bowers, All About Jazz

"This disc shows (sic)...a heavy beat, emphatic licks and impeccable playing."

- Ross Boissoneau, Local Spins Best of 2021

== Charts ==
Year	Chart	Type	Song/Album	Peak position	Chart date
2022	JazzWeek Airplay Reporting	album	The Pugilist	23	March 14, 2022

== Track listing ==
1. "The Pugilist" (James McMillen) – 3:49
2. "Running and Jumping" (Andrew Neu) – 5:05
3. "Lulu’s Back In Town" (Al Dubin, Harry Warren} – 3:58
4. "Don't Stop 'Til You Get Enough" (Michael Jackson) – 4:23
5. "You'd Be So Nice to Come Home To" (Cole Porter) – 5:46
6. "World Premiere" (James McMillen) – 4:50
7. "Positive for the Blues" (Nan Schwartz) – 5:28
8. "10or 2oon" (Brian Williams) – 3:05
9. "Rico’s Rowdy Rhumba" (James McMillen) – 4:30
10. "I Got Rhythm" (George Gershwin, Ira Gershwin) – 3:41
11. "La Vie En Rose" (Louiguy, Edith Piaf} – 3:12
12. "All Blues" (Miles Davis) – 4:51
13. "What Could Possibly Go Wrong?" (Andrew Neu) – 5:42
14. "Zomby Woof" (Frank Zappa) – 5:00

== Personnel ==
- Bernie Dresel - drums
- The BBB:
  - Brian Scanlon - alto saxophone, soprano saxophone (lead)
  - Kirsten Edkins - alto saxophone
  - Rob Lockart, Tom Luer - tenor saxophone
  - Brian Williams - baritone saxophone
  - Dave Richards, Jamie Hovorka, Anthony Bonsera - trumpet (lead)
  - Carl Saunders, Jeff Bunnell - trumpet
  - Alan Kaplan - trombone (lead)
  - Ryan Dragon, James McMillen - trombone
  - Juliane Gralle - bass trombone
  - Andrew Synowiec - guitars and electric bass
  - Djordje Stijepovic - Upright Slap Bass
  - Carl Saunders - vocal (7)
  - Anthony Bonsera - vocal and synth piano (14)
- Jack Cooper (3), James McMillen (4, 9, 10), Dave Richards (5), Tim Simonec (11), Jeff Bunnell (12), Anthony Bonsera (14) - arrangers

Production

- Wilfried Van Baelen - Executive producer
- Bernie Dresel, Gary Reber - Producer
- Patrick Lemmens - Recording engineer
- Patrick Lemmens, Wilfried Van Baelen - Mixing engineers
- Tom Van Achte - Mastering engineer
- Recorded at various locations in Los Angeles and compiled by Patrick Lemmens
- Mixed at Galaxy Studios, Mol, Belgium

== See also ==
- Bernie Dresel
- Galaxy Studios
- Carl Saunders
- Nan Schwartz
- Jack Cooper
