= Terell Stafford =

American jazz trumpet player and educator (born 1966)

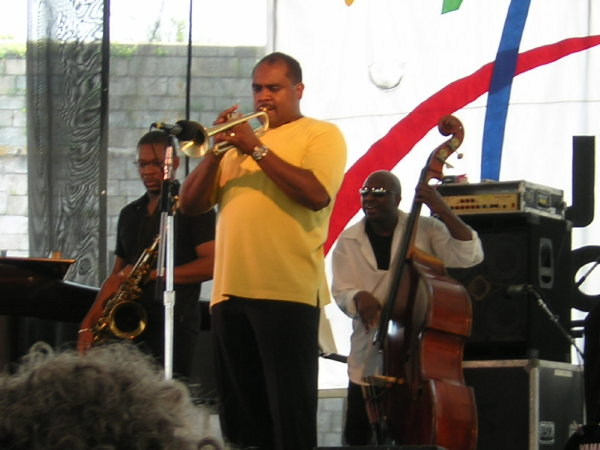
- Stafford (center) with Ravi Coltrane (left) and Charnett Moffett (right), performing at the Newport Jazz Festival in 2005

Background information
- Born: Terell Lamark Stafford; November 25, 1966 (age 59); Miami, Florida, U.S.
- Genre: Jazz
- Occupation: Musician
- Instrument: Trumpet
- Years active: 1995–present
- Website: www.terellstafford.com

Terell Lamark Stafford (born November 25, 1966) is a professional jazz trumpeter and the current Director of Jazz Studies at the Boyer College of Music and Dance at Temple University.

== Career ==
Stafford was born in Miami, Florida, and raised in both Chicago, Illinois, and Silver Spring, Maryland. He earned a degree in music education from the University of Maryland in 1988 and a degree in classical trumpet performance from Rutgers University in 1991. Originally a classical trumpet player, Stafford soon branched out to jazz with the University of Maryland jazz band.

His career in jazz soon picked up, and he has played with McCoy Tyner, Christian McBride, John Clayton, Steve Turre, Dave Valentin, and Russell Malone, among others, and on stages such as Carnegie Hall and The Tonight Show with Jay Leno. He released a CD entitled New Beginnings featuring a number of up-and-coming musicians, such as bassist Derrick Hodge.

In addition to his position at Temple, Stafford has also worked with the Juilliard School's jazz program, with Jazz at Lincoln Center's Essentially Ellington program, and with the 2006 All-Alaska Jazz Band.

== Discography ==
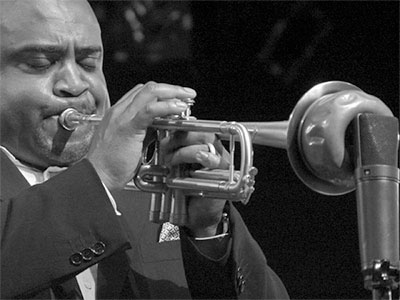
Stafford in Aarhus, Denmark, 2012

=== As leader ===
- Time To Let Go (Candid, 1995)
- Centripetal Force (Candid, 1996)
- Fields of Gold (Nagel Heyer, 2000) – recorded in 1999
- New Beginnings (Maxjazz, 2003)
- Taking Chances: Live at the Dakota (Maxjazz, 2005)
- Bridging the Gap (Planet Arts, 2009)
- This Side of Strayhorn (Maxjazz, 2011)
- Brotherlee Love (Capri, 2015)
- Forgive and Forget (Herb Harris Music, 2016)
- Family Feeling (BCM&D Records, 2018)

=== As sideman ===
- Arkadia Jazz All-Stars, Thank You, Joe (Arkadia Jazz, 1999)
- Bruce Barth, East and West (Maxjazz, 2001)
- Cecil Brooks III, Neck Peckin' Jammie (Muse, 1993)
- Marc Cary, Listen (Arabesque, 1996)
- Jack Cooper and the DoAM Jazz Orchestra, Mists: Charles Ives for Jazz Orchestra (Planet Arts, 2014)
- Cornell Dupree, Bop'n Blues (Kokopelli, 1995)
- Lafayette Harris Jr., Lafayette Is Here! (Muse, 1992)
- Carlos Henriquez, Dizzy con Clave (RodBros, 2018)
- Victor Lewis, Eeeyyess! (Enja, 1996)
- Herbie Mann, America/Brazil (Lightyear, 1995)
- Ferit Odman, Dameronia With Strings (Equinox, 2015)
- Ferit Odman, Autumn in New York (Equinox, 2011)
- Houston Person, Moment to Moment (HighNote, 2010)
- Shirley Scott, A Walkin' Thing (Candid, 1992)
- Stephen Scott, Aminah's Dream (Verve, 1992)
- Melissa Walker, May I Feel (Enja, 1997)
- Tim Warfield, A Cool Blue (Criss Cross, 1994)
- Tim Warfield, A Whisper in the Midnight (Criss Cross, 1995)
- Tim Warfield, Gentle Warrior (Criss Cross Jazz, 1997)
- Bobby Watson, Tailor Made (Columbia, 1992)
- Bobby Watson, Midwest Shuffle (Columbia, 1993)
- Ed Wiley, In Remembrance (Swing, 1995)
- Gerald Wilson, Monterey Moods (Mack Avenue, 2007)
