= I Can Do All Things =

Studio album by Jeremy Warren
- Released: 2016
- Recorded: March 22nd and April 22nd Flux Studios; New York, New York
- Genre: jazz, fusion
- Length: 1:07:50
- Label: JDW Music
- Producer: Jeremy Warren

I Can Do All Things is the premiere recording from jazz artist, composer Jeremy Warren. The album features prominent performers and composers such as Andy Milne, Lenny Pickett, Leon Marin, and Jack Cooper.

== Background ==
I Can Do All Things features Jeremy Warren's group The Rudiment and compositions written by Warren, Andy Milne, Jack Cooper and Dermel Warren (his wife). The music captures mixes the jazz art form with the elements of contemporary popular music and is a personal journey of overcoming life's obstacles through music.

The album contains the many influences from Warren's musical upbringing and musical journey from Little Rock, to Memphis TN and eventually to New York City. He was born and raised in North Little Rock and heavily exposed to music growing up. His mother is an organist/pianist where she played at his grandfather's and now currently his father's church in Little Rock. In 2003, he received a full scholarship to the University of Memphis Scheidt School of Music in Memphis, TN. He earned dual bachelor's degrees in Jazz Studies and Music Education. Warren notes his greatest and most influential musical growth happened in Memphis where he performed with numerous local/national artists as well as leading his own group every Saturday night on Beale Street for two years.

Warren moved to New York City in 2013 and received his master's degree in Music from New York University in May 2015. Key connections through that school and the city such as Andy Milne and Lenny Pickett are heard on the "I Can Do All Things" recording.

== Track listing ==
All tracks are written by noted.

No.	Title	Writer(s)	Length
1.	"I Can Do All Things"	Jeremy Warren	8:50
2.	"Modern Warfare"	Jeremy Warren	7:44
3.	"Yet Faithful"	Jeremy Warren and Dermel Warren	7:07
4.	"Livin' Way Up"	Jeremy Warren and Leon Marin	1:48
5.	"You Got It"	Jonathan Davenport	5:03
6.	"No Words Interlude"	Jeremy Warren	3:10
7.	"Lost Friends"	Jeremy Warren and Dermel Warren	9:09
8.	"Battle with Steven"	Jeremy Warren	8:52
9.	"Drummer's Blues"	Jeremy Warren	8:17
10.	"J-Dubb's Step"	Jack Cooper	7:50

== Recording sessions ==
- March 22 and April 12, 2016, Flux Studios, New York, New York
- April 21 and 27, 2016, at NYU, New York, New York

== Personnel ==
=== Musicians ===
- Drums: Jeremy Warren
- Vocal: Dermel Warren
- Vocal: Gloria Ryan
- Vocal (male voice): Leon Marin
- Trumpet: Gil Defay
- Alto saxophone: Rakiem Walker
- Alto saxophone: Ethan Helm
- Tenor saxophone: Lenny Pickett
- Piano/keyboards: Andy Milne
- Piano/keyboards: Joel Desroches
- Organ: Sam Carroll
- Bass: Parker McAllister
- Bass: Gabe Otero

=== Production ===
- Producer, composer: Jeremy Warren
- Producer: Dermel Warren
- Recording engineer: Josh Welshman
- Recording engineer: Tyler McDiarmid
- Mixing and Mastering: Eric Robinson, Zosermusic
- Liner Notes: Jeremy Warren
- Cover art and design: Smith-Lenior Graphic Creations
- Photography: Keeshan Defay

== Promotion ==
Kari-on Productions headquartered in Atlanta, GA is the firm handling the promotion of "I Can Do All Things" record release. The CD was submitted for the 2017 Grammy ballot in the categories R & B Album and Recording Package.

Music from the recording has been premiered and heard in numerous jazz and music venues in the New York/New Jersey region of the United States.

July 16, 2015 -- Papillion 25, South Orange, NJ

August 16, 2015 -- Harlem Nights Club, New York, NY

September 28, 2015—Whynot Jazz Room, New York, NY

November 7, 2015 -- Nabe Underground, Harlem, NY

December 13, 2015 -- Minton's Jazz Club, Harlem, NY

March 11, 2016 -- Club Bonafide, New York, NY

The album release (premiere) on June 1, 2016 was at Rockwood Music Hall in Manhattan, NY

== Reception ==
Professional ratings
Review scores
Source	Rating
AXS	Highly favorable
All About Jazz	Highly favorable #3 of Top 25 "Recommended" Album Reviews; 2016
Midwest Record	Highly favorable
JazzTimes	Highly favorable
Commercial Appeal	Feature article
The Jazz Owl	Highly favorable
Improvijazzation Nation	Highly favorable
Roots Music Report	13 weeks charted Peak #3 #85 of Top 200 Jazz; Albums for 2016
CMJ New Music	10 weeks charted Peak #6
JazzWeek	19 weeks charted Peak #68

I Can Do All Things charted for 13 weeks and peaked on the Roots Music Report airplay ratings; it peaked at #3. On the CMJ New Music ratings for airplay it charted for 10 weeks and peaked at #6. On the JazzWeek ratings it has charted for 19 weeks and peaking at #68 on August 22, 2016.

"Influences of Memphis blues can be detected throughout the recording combined with rations of R&B and soul making for an enjoyable jaunt." Susan Frances, AXS

"...a clinic from Jeremy on how to create melodic drum lines and in giving space to other artists without diminishing your own mission. Jeremy knows how to kick off an album." Travis Rogers, JazzTimes

"...(Jeremy) is a very talented and soulful drummer who has a beautiful feel and a great musical understanding." Lenny Pickett (Saturday Night Live)

== See also ==
- Andy Milne
- Lenny Pickett
- Jack Cooper

== Release history ==
Region	Date	Label	Format
United States	June 1, 2016	J.W. Music	CD, digital download
