= Mississippi Rising =

- Mississippi Rising, DVD
- Also known as: The Concert in Support of the Hurricane Katrina Recovery Efforts (2005)
- Genre: Concert/Telethon
- Created by: Sam Haskell
- Developed by: Sam Haskell
- Written by: Pamela K. Long
- Directed by: Paul Miller
- Presented by: Morgan Freeman
- Starring: Morgan Freeman, Rita Cosby
- Music by: Harold Wheeler
- Country of origin: United States
- Original language: English

Production
- Executive producers: Sam Haskell, Lanny Griffith, Michael B. Seligman, Hudson Hickman
- Producer: Nels Bangerter
- Production location: Oxford, Mississippi
- Cinematography: Penelope Spheeris
- Running time: 182 minutes
- Production companies: Magnolia Hill Entertainment; Seligman Entertainment

Original release
- Network: MSNBC
- Release: October 1, 2005

Mississippi Rising - The Concert in Support of the Hurricane Katrina Recovery Efforts (2005) telethon (2 DVD set) was quickly put together after Hurricane Katrina had devastated the Gulf Coast of the United States between 23 and 30 August 2005. This three-hour concert and telethon was broadcast live on MSNBC throughout North America on October 1, 2005. It was marketed commercially as a 2 DVD set in very limited numbers. All proceeds have gone to the Mississippi Hurricane Recovery Fund.

== Production ==
The production was telecast from the University of Mississippi (Oxford, MS) on 1 October 2005; C. M. Tad Smith Coliseum was converted into a television production facility in order to accommodate the media production, telecast, and live concert. Native Mississippians, Sam Haskell III and Lanny Griffith produced the event. The event was underwritten by a contribution to the Mississippi Hurricane Recovery Fund by UnitedHealth Group Foundation.

All proceeds went to the Mississippi Hurricane Recovery Fund (www.mississippirecovery.com) or a similar fund in Louisiana administered by Foundations for Recovery, The Hurricane Katrina New Orleans Recovery Fund (www.foundationsforrecovery.org). The event raised in excess of $15 million.

The event featured numerous celebrities backed by a live 50 piece studio orchestra.

After Hurricane Katrina, Whoopi Goldberg and director Penelope Spheeris collaborated to tell the stories of residents of Biloxi, Mississippi for MSNBC's "Mississippi Rising" telethon. Twelve two-three-minute short documentaries aired during the October 1, 2005 broadcast.

=== Featured celebrities ===
Faith Hill, Jason Alexander, Sela Ward, Whoopi Goldberg, Doris Roberts, Macy Gray, Ray Romano, Samuel L. Jackson, Lance Bass, Jean Smart, Marilu Henner, Steve Azar, Kathy Ireland, Delta Burke, Mary Donnelly-Haskell, Kristian Alfonso, Debbie Allen, George W. Bush, Bill Clinton, Gary Collins, Billy Davis Jr., Brett Favre, Gary Grubbs, Deidre Hall, Kathy Ireland, Diana Krall, Lenny Kravitz, Marilyn McCoo, Brian McKnight, Gerald McRaney, Mary Ann Mobley, Gary Morris, Peter Reckell, Greg Rikaart, Joe Scarborough, Melody Thomas Scott, Alison Sweeney, Pam Tillis, Trent Lott, Haley Barbour

=== Musicians (studio orchestra) ===
- Musical contractor(s): Bill Hughes, Jack Cooper
- Conductor/arranger: Harold Wheeler
- Violin: Jackson/Mississippi Symphony members
- Viola: Jackson/Mississippi Symphony members
- Cello: Jackson/Mississippi Symphony members
- Basses: Jackson/Mississippi Symphony members
- Saxophones/Woodwinds: Sal Lozano, John Lux, Larry Panella, Jack Cooper, Tom Link
- Trumpets: Rick Baptist, David Spencer, Jamey Simmons, Brandon Potts
- Trombones: John Mahoney, Brian O'Neill, Steve Suter
- Guitar: Steve Gregory
- Keyboards: Pat Coil
- Bass (amplified): Trey Henry
- Drums: Vinnie Colaiuta

=== Production crew ===
- Cinematography: Penelope Spheeris
- Producer, documentary segment: Hudson Hickman
- Editor, documentary segment: Nels Bangerter
- Talent escort and production assistant: Wendy Bell
- Production assistant: Michael Kettering
- Script coordinator: David Lucky
- talent assistant: Jenny Morgan
- production assistant: Tim Reeves
- travel coordinator: Christina Tong
- transportation coordinator: Bob Maywhort

== Media ==
- September 28, 2005 – MSNBC will air 'Mississippi Rising' October 1st from 8 p.m. - 11 p.m. ET.
- Life Magazine, "Mississippi Rising" Gala Concert To Benefit Recovery Effort
- WIREIMAGE, pictures of "Mississippi Rising" concert and T.V. Broadcast, October 1, 2005
- Mississippi Rising, Personal passion: Sam Haskell. Variety Magazine, Thursday July 13, 2006, by Anna Stewart
- Mississippi Stars Team Up For Benefit Concert, Contactmusic, September 24, 2005
