= You'd Be So Nice to Come Home To =

1942 song by Cole Porter

Single by Dinah Shore
- B-side: "Manhattan Serenade"
- Published: October 5, 1942 by Chappell & Co., Inc., New York
- Released: November 20, 1942
- Recorded: July 30, 1942
- Venue: Something to Shout About 1943
- Genre: Popular music, Musical film, Pop standard
- Length: 2:51
- Label: Victor 20-1519
- Songwriter: Cole Porter

"You'd Be So Nice to Come Home To" is a popular song written by Cole Porter for the 1943 film Something to Shout About, where it was introduced by Janet Blair and Don Ameche. The song was nominated for the Academy Award for Best Original Song in 1943 but lost to "You'll Never Know". It featured in The Fortune Cookie, a 1966 Billy Wilder movie, sung by Judi West.

== Other recordings ==
- Dinah Shore had a hit with the song at the time of its introduction.
- Helen Merrill with Clifford Brown – Helen Merrill (1954)
- Cannonball Adderley – Compact Jazz - Capitol - (1955)
- Cecil Taylor – Jazz Advance (1956)
- Art Pepper – Art Pepper Meets the Rhythm Section (1957)
- Coleman Hawkins and Ben Webster – Coleman Hawkins Encounters Ben Webster (1957)
- Frank Sinatra – A Swingin' Affair! (1957)
- Bing Crosby and Rosemary Clooney recorded the song for their radio show in 1958 and it was released on the album Bing & Rosie – The Crosby-Clooney Radio Sessions (2010).
- Wes Montgomery – One Night in Indy (recorded 1959, released 2016)
- Sarah Vaughan – After Hours at the London House (1959)
- Nina Simone – Nina Simone at Newport (1960)
- Jo Stafford with Ben Webster – Jo + Jazz (1960)
- Al Cohn and Zoot Sims – You 'n' Me (1960)
- Julie London – Julie...At Home (1960)
- Nancy Wilson – Hollywood – My Way (1963)
- The Coasters – One by One (1960)
- Lee Konitz – Motion (1961)
- Jim Hall with Chet Baker and Paul Desmond – Concierto – (1975)
- Dionne Warwick – Dionne Warwick Sings Cole Porter (1990)
- Joey DeFrancesco – Singin' and Swingin' (1999)
- Dick Hyman and Randy Sandke – Now & Again (2004)
- Tina May, accompanied by pianist Nikki Iles – A Wing and a Prayer (2006)
- Jacky Terrasson – Push (2010)
- Xiu Xiu – Nina (2013)
- Harry Connick Jr. (2019)
- Marisa Anderson, Tara Jane O'Neil (2020)
- Bernie Dresel – The Pugilist (2021)
- Andrew Bird – Sunday Morning Put-On (2024)
