= SkyDeck Music =

American record label and print publisher

- Founded: 2007
- Founder: Dave Lisik, Eric Allen
- Status: active
- Genre: Jazz, classical, electroacoustic
- Country of origin: United States
- Location: Chicago; London
- Official website: www.skydeckmusic.com

SkyDeck Music is a record label and print publisher. The label started in the United States in 2007 as Galloping Cow Records and has released albums by Seamus Blake, Luis Bonilla, Tim Hagans, Jazzgroove Mothership Orchestra, Donny McCaslin, Dick Oatts, Chris Potter, Alex Sipiagin, and Matt Wilson.

== Awards and honors ==
The list of jazz artists for SkyDeck Music includes Alex Sipiagin, Chris Potter, Seamus Blake, Dick Oatts, Luis Bonilla, the Jazzgroove Mothership Orchestra, Boris Kozlov, Dave Kikoski, Jeff "Tain" Watts, Eric Harland and Matt Wilson. SkyDeck's book 50 Years at The Village Vanguard: Thad Jones, Mel Lewis and the Vanguard Jazz Orchestra was praised by All About Jazz and Down Beat magazine.

== Recordings and books ==
The SkyDeck catalog represents both audio recordings and books.

=== SkyDeck Recordings ===
| Item # | Album | Artist | Release year |
|---|---|---|---|
| SDM 1001 | Coming Through Slaughter: The Bolden Legend | Dave Lisik Orchestra (featuring Tim Hagans, Donny McCaslin, Luis Bonilla and Matt Wilson) | 2010 |
| SDM 1202 | Walkabout: A Place for Visions | Jazzgroove Mothership Orchestra (featuring Alex Sipiagin and Bob Sheppard) | 2012 |
| SDM 1403 | Machaut Man and a Superman Hat | Alex Sipiagin, Donny McCaslin, Dave Kikoski, Boris Kozlov, Donald Edwards | 2014 |
| SDM 2004 | Hitch / Slap | Donny McCaslin, Luis Bonilla, Andy McKee, Jeff "Tain" Watts | 2020 |
| SDM 1705 | Bonnie and Clyde | Alex Sipiagin/David Kikoski | 2017 |
| SDM 1606 | In Passing | Dave Wilson, Gabe Lavin | 2016 |
| SDM 2107 | Students In Exile | Alex Sipiagin, Seamus Blake, Dave Lisik | 2021 |
| SDM 1108 | The Curse of the Queen's Diamond | Dave Lisik/Richard Nunns | 2011 |
| SDM 2109 | Origin of Species | Dave Lisik Orchestra | 2023 |
| SDM 1710 | Relativity | Alex Sipiagin, Chris Potter, Will Vinson, John Escreet, Boris Kozlov, Eric Harland, Alina Engibaryan | 2017 |
| SDM 1611 | On the Face Place | CSPS Ensemble | 2016 |
| SDM 2112 | Sanctuary to Sea | Andrew Cole, Jorge Sosa, Dave Lisik | 2021 |
| SDM 1813 | Hip Walk | Rodger Fox Big Band | 2018 |
| SDM 1714 | ReAmped | Nick Granville, Benjamin J. Shepherd, Dylan Elise | 2017 |
| SDM 2115 | Timewave Zero | Dave Lisik | 2021 |
| SDM 1116 | Rail 16 | Dave Lisik, Adam Page, Tim Hopkins, Martin Riseley, Inbal Megiddo, Paul Altomari, Jian Liu, Lance Philip | 2012 |
| SDM 1717 | Funkbone Experience | Rodger Fox | 2017 |
| SDM 1718 | Fearless Music | Umar Zakaria, Roger Manins, Leonardo Coghini, Luther Hunt | 2017 |
| SDM 2119 | Stuck in a Moment | Dave Lisik, Bob Sheppard, Matt Wilson | 2021 |
| SDM 2020 | Joust | Alex Sipiagin/David Kikoski | 2020 |
| SDM 1721 | Stato Liquido | Esther Lamneck, Eugenio Sanna, Eric Lyon | 2017 |
| SDM 1122 | Ancient Astronaut Theory | Dave Lisik, Richard Nunns | 2011 |
| SDM 1123 | Donated By Cantor Fitzgerald | Dave Lisik | 2011 |
| SDM 1924 | J&K South of the Border | Luis Bonilla, Luke Malewicz, Bruce Barth, Andy McKee, John Riley, Roberto Quintero | 2019 |
| SDM 1825 | Oneira | Aabir Mazumdar | 2018 |
| SDM 2226 | Solipsis - Music of Ryan Brake | Endeavour Jazz Orchestra New Zealand | 2022 |
| SDM 2227 | Metropolis | Dave Lisik Orchestra | 2023 |
| SDM 1828 | Slaves of Memories | Davide Raisi | 2018 |
| SDM 1729 | 24 Paganini Caprices | Martin Riseley | 2017 |
| SDM 2030 | While We Wait | Christopher's Very Happy. Band. | 2020 |
| SDM 1131 | Journey | Jorge Sosa, Dave Lisik | 2011 |
| SDM 1933 | Brahms - Three Sonatas for Violin and Piano | Martin Riseley and Janet Scott Hoyt | 2019 |
| SDM 1838 | Synthesis | Anthony Williams | 2018 |
| SDM 2239 | Reconnect | Mike Conrad Trio | 2022 |
| SDM 2244 | Full Moon Session | Benjy Sandler | 2022 |
| SDM 2048 | Itty-Bitty Bluesopera | David Peoples | 2020 |
| SDM 2353 | Hillary Step | Endeavour Jazz Orchestra New Zealand | 2023 |
| SDM 2354 | John White - Requiem Mass | Endeavour Jazz Orchestra New Zealand | 2023 |
| SDM 2455 | Omnifenix | Endeavour Jazz Orchestra New Zealand | 2024 |
| SDM 2456 | Jeep's Blues | Endeavour Jazz Orchestra Duke Wellington Project | 2024 |
| SDM 2459 | Porgy and Bess | Endeavour Jazz Orchestra New Zealand | 2024 |
| SDM 2361 | My Favorite Things | Endeavour Jazz Orchestra New Zealand | 2023 |
| SDM 2075 | Wellington Solos Volume 1 | Leonardo Coghini | 2020 |
| SDM 2076 | Wellington Solos Volume 2 | Leonardo Coghini | 2020 |
| SDM 2077 | Wellington Solos Volume 3 | Leonardo Coghini | 2020 |
| SDM 2386 | Thad 100 - Music of Thad Jones | Endeavour Jazz Orchestra New Zealand | 2023 |

=== SkyDeck Publishing ===
| Title | Authors | Release year | ISBN # |
|---|---|---|---|
| 50 Years at the Village Vanguard: Thad Jones, Mel Lewis and the Vanguard Jazz Orchestra | Dave Lisik, Eric Allen | 2017 | 0692808582, 9780692808580 |

== See also ==
- List of record labels
