= Man Against the Mob =

- DVD cover and poster
- Genre: Action; Crime; Drama
- Screenplay by: David J. Kinghorn
- Story by: John Rester Zodrow; David J. Kinghorn
- Directed by: Steven Hilliard Stern
- Starring: George Peppard; Kathryn Harrold; Max Gail; Stella Stevens; Barry Corbin
- Music by: Artie Kane
- Country of origin: United States
- Original language: English

Production
- Executive producers: Robert M. Sertner; Frank von Zerneck
- Cinematography: Neil Roach
- Editor: Barrett Taylor
- Running time: 100 minutes
- Production companies: Von Zerneck Sertner Films; Worldwide Media

Original release
- Network: NBC
- Release: January 10, 1988

Related
- Man Against the Mob: The Chinatown Murders

Man Against the Mob (also known as Trouble in the City of Angels) is a 1988 NBC television movie directed by Steven Hilliard Stern, starring George Peppard, Kathryn Harrold and Max Gail. Man Against the Mob is a precursor of the 2013 theatrical feature Gangster Squad, in that it deals with the post-war formation of a special LAPD unit set up to suppress Organized Crime in Los Angeles. It may have been inspired by the success of the 1987 theatrical feature The Untouchables, a period drama which also depicted an elite law enforcement unit pitted against mobsters. This was designed around the actor George Peppard as a tough LA cop in the late 1940s. A December 10, 1989 NBC-TV movie follow-up, Man Against the Mob: The Chinatown Murders, is a sequel that also stars Peppard, reuniting him with his co-star from The Blue Max, Ursula Andress. The first movie was a pilot of a proposed NBC series entitled City of Angels but ended up panning out as only the two TV movies before George Peppard died in 1994.

== Background and plot ==
Investigating a brutal homicide, Peppard discovers that the killing is more than a common sex crime. A trail of evidence leads Peppard to a group of visiting Chicago mobsters, and ultimately to several of Los Angeles' better known citizens. Set in Los Angeles in the 1940s just after the War, the script has some pointed humour and there are witty lines and dialogue exchanges. Kathryn Harrold plays a War widow who is the love interest. He has lost his wife, Kathryn has lost her husband, and they both slowly get attracted to one another. Steven Stern does a satisfactory job of directing. Peppard's character is heroic, straight and honest, and fights the Mob's attempts to come in from New Jersey and infiltrate L.A., and they are being aided by an entire division of corrupt L.A. cops known as 'Metro Division'. Peppard escapes several assassination attempts, won't give up, and becomes pretty much a lone wolf as his few supporters are killed around him. Stella Stevens plays an owner of a nightclub. Part of the shooting of the movie was done at the Drake Hotel in Chicago as well as older historic hotels in Los Angeles in the MacArthur Park area.

== Featured cast ==
Actor	Role
George Peppard	Frank Doakey
Kathryn Harrold	Marilyn Butler
Max Gail	Rusty Kitchens
Barry Corbin	"Big Mac" McCleary
Fredric Lehne	Sammy Turner
Stella Stevens	Joey Day
Norman Alden	Captain Necker
Cheryl Anderson	Grace Kitchens
Paul Sylvan	Vinny DeMarco

== Reception ==
It was the 17th highest rated show of the week.

== Production information, crew, credits, misc. ==
- Production Companies: NBC, Von Zerneck Sertner Films, Worldwide Media
- Executive Producers: Frank Von Zerneck, Robert M. Sertner
- Producers: Phillips Wylly Sr., Steven Hilliard Stern
- Co-Producer: John Rester Zodrow
- Associate Producer: Susan Weber-Gold
- Director: Steven Hilliard Stern
- Editor: Barrett Taylor
- Negative cutter: Susanne Gervay
- Assistant Editor: Bob Leader
- Casting: Dick Dinman
- Music: Artie Kane
- Music editor: John Mick
- Music Supervisor: Terri Fricon
- Extras Casting: Bill Dance
- Actors/musicians (in club scenes): Luis Bonilla, Jack Cooper, Phil Feather, Alan Parr, Charlie Richard
- Production Manager: Phillips Wylly Sr.
- Assistant Directors: Ray Marsh, James J. Fitzpatrick
- Location Managers: Flip Wylly, Barry S. Jones
- Script Supervisor: Lee Nowak
- Production Coordinator: Anne Hart
- Production Designer: Shay Austin
- Set Decorator: Debra Combs
- Sound, Sound mixer: Richard Lightstone
- Sound re-recording: Wayne Artman, Tom Beckert, Tom Dahl
- Sound Effects: Rich Harrison
- Director of Photography: Denis Lewiston
- Camera Operator: Monty Rowan
- Costumes: Donna Roberts-Orme
- Hair Stylist: DeAnn Power
- Makeup: Davida W. Simon

== Critiques, reviews, ratings ==
There is an interesting entry by James Robert Parish in his book Prostitution in Hollywood films: plots, critiques, casts, and credits for 389 theatrical and made-for-television releases (1992) talking about the plot and the use of prostitution as part of the two Man Against the Mob TV movies.

- review

"...thanks to George Peppard's performance the film scored excellent ratings when first telecast in 1988. A 1989 TV-movie followup, Man Against the Mob: The Chinatown Murders failed to match the ratings of the first effort." Hal Erickson - Allrovi

== Awards ==
=== 1989 Edgar Allan Poe Awards ===
- Best Television Feature or Miniseries writing: David J. Kinghorn
