= Coming Through Slaughter: The Bolden Legend =

Studio album by Dave Lisik
- Released: December 29, 2009
- Recorded: Memphis, Tennessee, U.S. Bloomington, Indiana, U.S. Staten Island, New York, U.S.
- Genre: Jazz, Big band, instrumental
- Length: 68:26
- Label: SkyDeck Music
- Producer: Dave Lisik

Dave Lisik chronology
Hurricane Ophelia (2008)	Coming Through Slaughter: The Bolden Legend (2009)	Donated By Cantor Fitzgerald (2011)

Coming Through Slaughter: The Bolden Legend is the first large ensemble jazz album by composer Dave Lisik. It features trumpeter Tim Hagans, saxophonist Donny McCaslin, trombonist Luis Bonilla, and drummer Matt Wilson. The title and inspiration of the music (multi-movement jazz suite) and recording comes from the novel Coming Through Slaughter from the author Michael Ondaatje.

== Background ==
The recording features experimental music/jazz inspired by the book Coming Through Slaughter. This is performed in a large ensemble format and features a wide range of artists from the United States.

== Track listing ==
All tracks are written by Dave Lisik.

No.	Title	Length
1.	"Coming Through Slaughter"	11:20
2.	"Cricket Noises and Cricket Music"	8:19
3.	"The Drawings of Audubon"	4:37
4.	"Whistling in the Way of Bolden"	4:18
5.	"Auditorium of Enemies"	5:15
6.	"The Horror of Noise"	7:46
7.	"Suicide of the Hands"	7:42
8.	"In Exile"	5:00
9.	"The Parade - Part I"	5:40
10.	"The Parade - Part II"	4:58
11.	"Epilogue: Bleach Out to Grey"	3:25

== Recording Sessions ==
- Spring 2009
- recorded in Memphis TN, Bloomington, IN and Staten Island, N.Y.

== Personnel ==
=== Musicians ===
- Conductor/composer: Dave Lisik
- Trumpet (solo): Tim Hagans
- Trombone (solo): Luis Bonilla
- Soprano and tenor saxes (solo): Donny McCaslin
- Drums (featured): Matt Wilson
- Soprano sax, alto sax, flute, clarinet (lead): Jack Cooper
- Alto sax, flute, clarinet: Gary Topper
- Tenor sax, clarinet: Art Edmaiston
- Tenor sax, clarinet: Dustin Laurenzi
- Tenor sax, clarinet: Mike Krepper
- Bari sax, bass clarinet, tenor sax: Tom Link
- Trumpet, flugelhorn (lead): Joey Tartell
- Trumpet, flugelhorn: Marlin McKay
- Trumpet, flugelhorn: Ryan Imboden
- Trumpet, flugelhorn: Dave Lisik
- Horn: Jeff Nelsen
- Horn: Dan Phillips
- Trombone (lead): Anthony Williams
- Trombone: Tony Garcia
- Trombone: John Grodrian
- Bass trombone: David Dick
- Guitar: Corey Christiansen
- Piano: Amy Rempel
- Bass: Jeremy Allen
- Percussion: Joe Galvin

=== Production ===
- Recording: Robert Yugleur and Dave Lisik
- Mixing: Robert Yugleur, Dave Lisik, and Trevor Jorgensen
- Additional recording and mastering: Ed Reed
- Liner notes: Tom Graves

== Reception ==
Professional ratings
Review scores
Source	Rating
Down Beat	3.5/5 stars
JazzTimes Magazine	(excellent)
Jazz Station; The Best Jazz of 2010 (Brazil)	#9 of 10; Big Band CDs
The Commercial Appeal (Memphis)	(excellent)
All About Jazz	(very positive)
Exclaim! (Canada)	(very positive)
Winnipeg Free Press (Canada)	(very positive)
W. Royal Stokes’ Best CDs of 2010	Notable CDs of 2010

"...Although one can't know how someone else would have handled the task, Lisik has completed it with flying colors—thanks in part to splendid support from Hagans, McCaslin, Bonilla, Wilson and the ensemble. It must be noted that the album won't suit everyone's taste; it is more cerebral than candid, and its jagged edges can stun the senses and fray the nerves. But Lisik is telling a story, parts of which are ambivalent musically, as they were in life. Weighed on its own terms, Coming Through Slaughter is a well-drawn and admirable work of art."

Jack Bowers, AllAboutJazz.com

"...Evocative orchestral settings like "The Drawings of Audubon" and "Cricket Noises and Cricket Music" inspire Hagans, McCaslin and pianist Amy Rempel ― a CD standout ― to speak more with expressiveness than technical ability, always a good thing when musicians with their virtuosity are involved. Trombonist Luis Bonilla and percussionist Joe Galvin make strong statements on "Auditorium of Enemies," another intriguing composition by Lisik. On Coming Through Slaughter, flawless musicianship finds itself fully engaged with challenging material."

Glen Hall, exclaim.ca

"...Ondaatje's 1976 book draws on what historical record there is, but Lisik, a jazz trumpeter and professor, had no such resource...That turned out to be a good thing, however..." Chris Smith, Winnipeg Free Press
