= Luis Bonilla =

American jazz trombonist

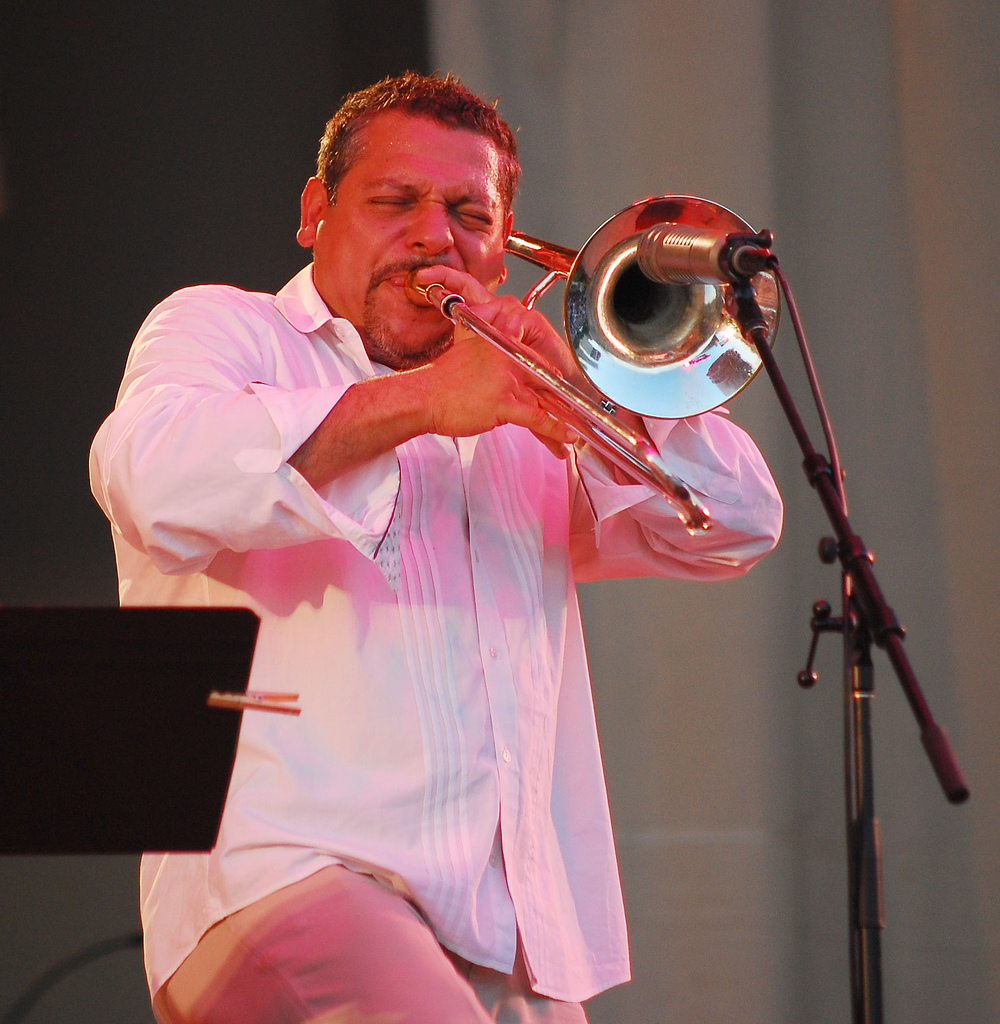
- Bonilla Brass Ecstasy at Chicago Jazz Festival 2008; Photo: Mark Mahar

Background information
- Born: Luis Diego Bonilla; October 12, 1965 (age 60); Los Angeles, California, U.S.
- Genres: Jazz, Afro-Cuban jazz, Latin jazz, R&B, pop
- Occupations: Musician, composer, record producer, educator
- Instrument: Trombone
- Years active: 1988–present
- Labels: Candid, Planet Arts
- Website: trombonilla.com

Luis Diego Bonilla (October 12, 1965) is an American jazz trombonist of Costa Rican descent. He is also a producer, composer, and educator.

== Biography ==
=== Early life, musical education and influences ===
Luis Bonilla was born and raised in Eagle Rock, California to parents who had immigrated to the United States from Costa Rica. He was introduced to music and jazz while attending Eagle Rock High School in Los Angeles. Bonilla was enrolled in a 'brass class' (believing it to be a metal shop class) only to find himself learning to play trombone. At Eagle Rock High School he studied under trumpeter John Rinaldo in a well established, award-winning music and jazz program that had produced musicians such as Roger Ingram, Carlos Vega, and Art Velasco. During this time he was heavily influenced by the playing and recordings of legendary trombonist Carl Fontana.

After graduating from Eagle Rock High School he studied music at California State University, Los Angeles earning a bachelor's degree in music. During his time at C.S.U.L.A. he was a member of both the #1 big band and the top jazz quintet taking top honors at the West Coast Collegiate Jazz Festival. Bonilla recorded on five notable recordings with the C.S.U.L.A. big band as a featured soloist and doing arranging for one of those LP's. He studied in Los Angeles with Don Raffell, Roy Main, David Caffey and former Stan Kenton trombonist/producer Bob Curnow. When later moving to New York City, he earned a master's degree in Jazz Performance and Composition from the Manhattan School of Music.

=== Move to New York and professional career ===
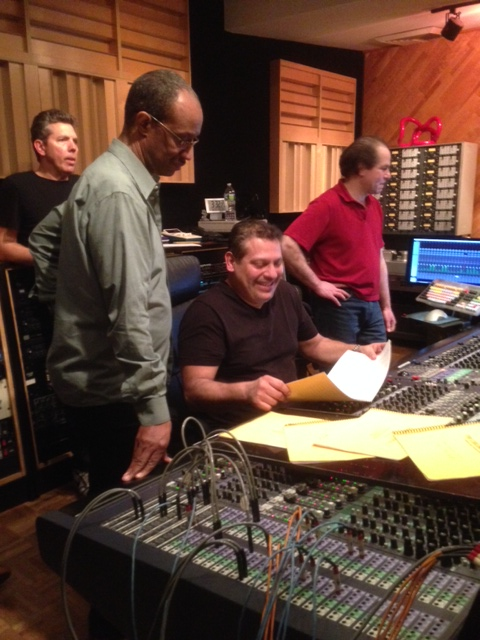
Luis Bonilla (seated) producing Mists: Charles Ives for Jazz Orchestra, April 2014

Bonilla moved to New York City in 1989 in hope of playing with one of his musical heroes, drummer Art Blakey. Bonilla eventually landed with Lester Bowie as the group's trombonist and continues to draw inspiration from Bowie with whom he toured and recorded with extensively. Bonilla refers to Bowie as his "father away from home", with whom he has learned a great deal about music and the creative process. He has supported himself as a session musician and a sideman performing with McCoy Tyner, Dizzy Gillespie, Tom Harrell, Freddie Hubbard, Astrud Gilberto, Willie Colón, and Toshiko Akiyoshi. He has demonstrated his versatility as a musician working and recording with artists as varied as Tito Nieves, Phil Collins, Tony Bennett, Alejandro Sanz, Diana Ross, Marc Anthony, La India, and Mary J. Blige.

He has been a member of the Mingus Big Band and the Jazz at Lincoln Center Afro Cuban Jazz Orchestra; he has also toured and recorded extensively with Dave Douglas. Most notably, he served as the 2nd trombonist (jazz chair) for the Vanguard Jazz Orchestra for 19 years (1999–2018). In February 2009, he received two Grammy Awards with the Vanguard Jazz Orchestra and featured with the Afro Latin Jazz Orchestra. Both of these groups have won numerous honors with Bonilla as part of those ensembles and as a featured soloist. Showing his versatility as a trombone artist, in 2010 he was featured as a classical soloist on The Chamber Wind Music of Jack Cooper and as a jazz soloist on the large ensemble recording Coming Through Slaughter – The Bolden Legend (SkyDeck). He served as main producer and trombonist in 2014 on the Mists: Charles Ives for Jazz Orchestra CD (Planet Arts, 2014) which garnered international acclaim.

=== Honors and recognition ===
Luis Bonilla is the winner of Downbeat magazine’s Rising Star honor in 2010 & 2011. As a trombone artist he was placed on the Downbeats’ Readers Poll in 2012. Bonilla was also named onto the 2011 JazzTimes critics poll for top trombone artists that year.

== Teaching ==
Luis Bonilla has taught at the Manhattan School of Music, Temple University, and the New England Conservatory. Since 2013, Bonilla has served as the musical director for the JM Jazz World International Youth Jazz Orchestra touring many parts of Europe. He has been a guest artist and clinician at numerous colleges and music schools in the United States and internationally to include the University of Memphis, University of Northern Iowa, Riverside City College, University of Wellington (NZ) and many more. He has taught at the Universität für Musik und darstellende Kunst in Graz, Austria.

== Grammy Awards as sideman ==
Year	Grammy category	Album or Single	Primary artist/group	Label	Role	Honor
2002	Best instrumental Jazz Performance, Big Band	Can I Persuade You? (album)	Vanguard Jazz Orchestra	Planet Arts	trombone/instrumentalist on all tracks	Nominated
2003	Best instrumental Jazz Performance, Big Band	New York, New Sound (album)	Gerald Wilson Orchestra	Mack Avenue	trombone/instrumentalist on all tracks	Nominated
2004	Best instrumental Jazz Performance, Big Band	The Way: Music Of Slide Hampton (album)	Vanguard Jazz Orchestra	Planet Arts	trombone/instrumentalist on all tracks	Nominated
2006	Best instrumental Jazz Performance, Big Band	Up From The Skies - Music Of Jim McNeely (album)	Vanguard Jazz Orchestra	Planet Arts	trombone/instrumentalist on all tracks	Nominated
2008	Best instrumental Jazz Performance, Big Band	Monday Night Live At The Village Vanguard (album)	Vanguard Jazz Orchestra	Planet Arts	trombone/instrumentalist on all tracks	Won
2008	Best Latin Jazz Album	Song For Chico (album)	Arturo O'Farrill and the Afro-Latin Jazz Orchestra	Zoho	trombone/instrumentalist on all tracks	Won
2011	Best instrumental Jazz Performance, Big Band	Legacy (album)	Gerald Wilson Orchestra	Mack Avenue	trombone/instrumentalist on all tracks	Nominated
2014	Best instrumental Jazz Performance, Big Band	OverTime: Music Of Bob Brookmeyer (album)	Vanguard Jazz Orchestra	Planet Arts	trombone/instrumentalist on all tracks	Nominated

== Discography ==
=== As leader ===
- Pasos Gigantes (Candid, 1991)
- Escucha! (Candid, 2000)
- Trombonilla (Now Jazz Consortium, 2005)
- I Talking Now! (Planet Arts, 2009)
- Twilight (Planet Arts, 2011)

=== As sideman ===
With Africando

- Mandali (Stern's Africa, 2000)
- Martina (Stern's Africa, 2003)
- Ketukuba (Stern's Africa, 2006)

With Lester Bowie

- The Fire This Time (In+Out, 1992)
- The Odyssey of Funk & Popular Music (Atlantic, 1998)

With Dave Douglas

- Spirit Moves (Greenleaf, 2009)
- United Front: Brass Ecstasy at Newport (Greenleaf, 2011)
- Rare Metal (Greenleaf, 2011)

With George Gruntz

- Liebermann (TCB, 1999)
- Merryteria (TCB, 1999)
- Expo Triangle (MGB, 2000)
- Global Excellence (TCB, 2001)
- Tiger by the Tail (TCB, 2006)

With the Vanguard Jazz Orchestra

- Can I Persuade You? (Planet Arts, 2001)
- The Way (Planet Arts, 2004)
- Up from the Skies (Planet Arts, 2006)
- Monday Night Live at the Village Vanguard (Planet Arts, 2008)
- Forever Lasting: Live in Tokyo (Planet Arts, 2011)
- Overtime Music of Bob Brookmeyer (Planet Arts, 2014)

With Gerald Wilson

- Jenna (Discovery, 1989)
- New York, New Sound (Mack Avenue, 2003)
- In My Time (Mack Avenue, 2005)
- Monterey Moods (Mack Avenue, 2007)
- Detroit (Mack Avenue, 2009)
- Legacy (Mack Avenue, 2011)

With others

- Toshiko Akiyoshi, Desert Lady / Fantasy (Columbia, 1994)
- Toshiko Akiyoshi, Monopoly Game (Novus J, 1998)
- Marc Anthony, Otra Nota (Sony, 1993)
- Billy Childs, The Child Within (Shanachie, 1996)
- Willie Colón, Prisioneros Del Mambo (Lone Wolf, 2008)
- Jack Cooper, The Chamber Wind Music of Jack Cooper (Centaur, 2010)
- Jack Cooper, Mists: Charles Ives for Jazz Orchestra (Planet Arts, 2014)
- Damian Drăghici, Damian's Fire (EMI, 2004)
- Paquito D'Rivera, Tropicana Nights (Chesky, 1999)
- Gloria Estefan, Brazil 305 (Sony, 2020)
- Pamela Fleming, Fearless Dreamer (Infinite Room, 1998)
- Astrud Gilberto, Jungle (Magya, 2002)
- Adam Green, Sixes & Sevens (Rough Trade, 2008)
- Tom Harrell, Wise Children (Bluebird, 2003)
- Freddie Hubbard, New Colors (Hip Bop, 2001)
- La India, Dicen Que Soy (Sony, 1994)
- Alvaro Lopez, Suenos (One Voice Music, 2000)
- Brian Lynch, Spheres of Influence (Sharp Nine, 1997)
- Donny McCaslin, Soar (Sunnyside, 2006)
- Hector Martignon, The Foreign Affair (Candid, 1998)
- Hector Martignon, The Big Band Theory (Zoho, 2016)
- Gerry Mulligan, Dragonfly (Telarc, 1995)
- Arturo O'Farrill, Una Noche Inolvidable (Palmetto, 2005)
- Arturo O'Farrill, Song for Chico (Zoho, 2008)
- Raulín Rosendo, Que Se Cuiden Los Soneros! (Day Dance, 1992)
- Dom Salvador, The Art of Samba Jazz (Salmarsi, 2010)
- Ken Schaphorst, How to Say Goodbye (JCA, 2016)
- The Skatalites, Ska Voovee (Shanachie, 1993)
- Bebo Valdes, Suite Cubana (Calle 54, 2009)
- Louie Vega, Elements of Life (Cutting Edge, 2003)
- Louie Vega, One Dream (Vega, 2007)

== DVD, movies, television ==
- 1988: Man Against the Mob (T.V. Movie, NBC)
- 1993: The Great Skatalites:Ska Explosion'92 (VHS, Tokuma Japan Communications Co., Ltd.)
- 2001: Unplugged (T.V. series with Alejandro Sanz, MTV)
- 2006: Jazz club, el sonido del bajo centro (T.V. series, Canal 22 Televisión Metropolitana)
- 2010: Chico & Rita (Movie, Gkids)
