= Symphony No. 3 (Ives) =

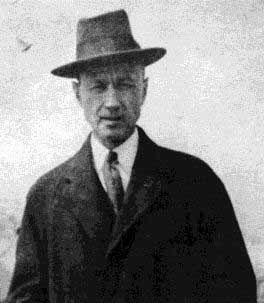
Charles Ives in 1913

The Symphony No. 3, S. 3 (K. 1A3), (subtitled The Camp Meeting) by Charles Ives was written between 1908 and 1910. In 1947, the symphony was awarded the Pulitzer Prize for Music. Ives is reported to have given half the money to Lou Harrison, who conducted the premiere.

== Structure ==
The symphony is in three movements:

1. Old Folks Gatherin' – Andante maestoso
2. Children's Day – Allegro
3. Communion – Largo

This symphony is notable for its use of a chamber orchestra, rather than the complete orchestra Ives used for his other symphonies. The symphony is also rather short, lasting approximately twenty minutes.

== Instrumentation ==
The symphony is scored for a chamber orchestra of a flute, oboe, clarinet, bassoon, two horns, trombone, bells, and strings (violins, violas, cellos, and double basses).

== Composition ==
The symphony has many influences including Civil War songs, dances, and general European classical music. It evokes country meetings during his childhood, when people gathered in fields to sing, preach, and listen. Ives was sentimentally nostalgic, glancing back as a modern composer at a nineteenth-century childhood of hymns, bells, and children's games throughout the three movements. The symphony is filled with complex harmonies and meters.

== The Mahler Confusion ==
Ives himself mentions Mahler exactly twice in his Memos, once in passing regarding attending a concert Mahler conducted, and then, equally casually, regarding the Third Symphony. Ives states "When [the Third Symphony] was being copied in, I think, Tams's office, Gustav Mahler saw it and asked to have a copy—he was quite interested in it.". In a footnote to a different section of the Memos, the editor and Ives scholar John Kirkpatrick adds that "The Tams score of 1911 is clearly 'the final score, now lost' —which Gustav Mahler (conductor of the New York Philharmonic 1909-11) took back to Germany in 1911, shortly before he died." Kirkpatrick provides no further information about this assertion, and Ives makes no mention of ever having met Mahler personally.

In the first full-length biography of Ives, published in 1955 by composer and musicologist Henry Cowell and his wife Sidney, there is also a footnote regarding Mahler. In a section discussing conductors who had seen Ives's music prior to 1932, the Cowells state "One of these was Gustav Mahler, who told Ives he would play the Third Symphony in Europe. But Mahler died before this intention could be carried out, and this score, too, was lost." Like Kirkpatrick, the Cowells provide no evidence for their claim, or for the implied assertion that Mahler ever met Ives.

In his problematic, anecdotal, and completely unreferenced 1974 biography of Ives, the British composer and conductor David Wooldridge first states "This is the version used in the published edition, after the revised 1909 edition, copied by Tams in 1910, disappeared to Europe with Gustav Mahler—another, later, longer story...". Later in the biography, Wooldridge mentions meeting a Bavarian percussionist in 1954 who claimed to have played the symphony under Mahler in Munich during the summer of 1910. In his review of the biography, John Kirkpatrick goes to some length to refute many of the more egregious claims made by Wooldridge, and other reviewers and scholars have since concluded that overall, Wooldridge's biography is unreliable.

The idea that Mahler possessed a score, intended to perform it - or even actually performed it - cannot be stated with any certainty given the information available.

== Premiere ==
There was no further interest in the symphony until Lou Harrison, a great fan of Ives' music, finally conducted it in New York on 5 April 1946. Bernard Herrmann, another composer who became a friend of Ives, conducted a CBS broadcast performance of the symphony soon after.

== See also ==
Zobel, Mark A. The Third Symphony of Charles Ives. Vol. 6 CMS Sourcebooks in American Music. Ed. Michael Budds. New York: Pendragon Press, 2009.
