= Once in a Blue Moon (University of Texas Jazz Orchestra album) =

Studio album by University of Texas Jazz Orchestra
- Released: 2000
- Recorded: Bates Recital Hall, University of Texas, Austin, Texas
- Genre: Jazz, big band
- Length: 66:32
- Label: UTJO
- Producer: Jeff Hellmer

University of Texas Jazz Orchestra chronology
Sixth Floor Jazz (1995)	Once in a Blue Moon (2000)	Good Days (2002)

Once in a Blue Moon is an album by the University of Texas Jazz Orchestra that was released in 2000. It features Gary Foster on saxophone.

== Background ==
This group that comprising the University of Texas Jazz Orchestra (during this time) is noted as one of the top collegiate jazz orchestras in the country having been invited to play at the 1997 International Association for Jazz Education Convention in Chicago. The group also played with James Moody, Manny Albam, Michael Brecker, Bobby Shew, and Jim McNeely in various concerts in this three-year period. Several members of the group have moved into teaching positions at major universities around the country and others are now established jazz artists.

== Reception ==
Professional ratings
Review scores
Source	Rating
All About Jazz	Very good

Writing for All About Jazz, Jack Bowers said of the album that "...Ensemble work is bright and secure, soloists spry and resourceful, choice of material — much of it composed and / or arranged by UT students or alumni — uncommon but for the most part admirable..."

== Track listing ==
All tracks are written by various artists listed.

No.	Title	Length
1.	"The Old Country (Curtis Lewis, arr. Paul McKee)"	7:19
2.	"Once in a Blue Moon (Steven Termini)"	4:50
3.	"Tom Sails Away (Charles Ives, arr. Jack Cooper)"	8:42
4.	"Tubs of Slaw (Greg Kehl Moore)"	8:28
5.	"The End of a Love Affair (E.C. Redding, arr. Lennie Niehaus)"	4:47
6.	"Music for a Rolling Doughnut (John Kregor)-UT AIME Group"	9:59
7.	"Tofu Scrambler (Paul White)"	10:16
8.	"Ev'rything I Love (Cole Porter. Jack Cooper)"	5:28
9.	"Hora Decubitus (Charles Mingus, arr. Jeff Hellmer)"	6:26
Total length:		66:32

== Recording sessions ==
- Recorded 1996 and 1999 live and in studio at the University of Texas at Austin

== Personnel ==
=== Musicians ===
- Conductor: Jeff Hellmer
- Alto saxophone (guest soloist): Gary Foster on "Ev'rything I Love"
- Saxes and woodwinds: Mace Hibbard, William Ferguson, Paul White, Dave Renter, David Box, Paul Haar, Colin Mason
- Trumpets and flugelhorns: Chip Crotts, Andy Cheetham, Warren Ealy, Rick White
- Trombones: Jerome Smith, Claudio Gariazzo, Thomas Lee, Wayne Myers, Bill Mann, Mike Hoffer
- Guitar: John Kregor
- Piano: Steve Snyder, Steven Termini
- Bass: Henry Lugo
- Drums: David Glover, Eric Middleton
- Percussion: Lisa Nicol

=== Production ===
- Recording/Mixing/Mastering engineer: Andy Murphy
- Liner notes: Jeff Hellmer
- Album design: Jodi Jenkins
