= JazzMn Orchestra =

JazzMN Orchestra
- Origin: Minneapolis/St. Paul, MN, US
- Genres: Jazz
- Years active: 1999–present
- Website: jazzmn.org

The JazzMN Orchestra is a 17-piece jazz ensemble and non-profit organization based in Minneapolis–Saint Paul with a mission to produce excellence and in the jazz art form through concerts and educational practices and in the process try to revitalize America's understanding of jazz. Its outreach program gives local students the opportunity to learn from and play alongside its musicians in concert. In order to this, JazzMN performs at several music festivals each year including the McNally Smith Winter Jazz Blast located at the McNally Smith College of Music.

== Band members ==
The majority of its members have a background in music education.

- Doug Snapp – Artistic Director

=== Saxophone ===
- Pete Whitman – alto saxophone
- Mike Walk – alto saxophone
- Dave Karr -tenor saxophone
- David Milne – tenor saxophone
- Kathy Jensen – baritone saxophone

=== Trumpet ===
- Bob Halgrimson
- Jeff Gottwig
- Adam Rossmiller
- Dave Jensen

=== Trombone ===
- Michael B. Nelson
- Dave Graf
- Ethan Freier
- Wade Clark – bass trombone

=== Rhythm section ===
- Mary Louise Knutson – piano
- Chris Olson – guitar
- Terry Burns – bass
- Joe Pulice – drums
- Rey Rivera – percussion

=== Guest vocalist ===
Connie Evingson

=== Featured artists ===
In addition to performing at festivals, JazzMN presents a concert series each year. The series consists of four shows, each with a different jazz theme or featured artist. In addition to the regular members of the band, the group has featured artists such as Randy Brecker, Arturo Sandoval, Gordon Goodwin, Wayne Bergeron, Phil Hey, and Eric Marienthal. It has performed at The Artists Quarter and the Dakota Jazz Club.

== Discography ==
- "JazzMN Big Band featuring Buddy DeFranco, Dave Weckl, and Irv Williams" (2000)
- "Enriching Life with Jazz" (2011)
