= Games (University of Northern Iowa Jazz Band One album) =

Studio album / live album by University of Northern Iowa Jazz Band One
- Released: October 1998
- Recorded: May 11/12, 1998; July 6, 1998
- Genre: Jazz, big band
- Length: 70:30
- Producer: Bob Washut

University of Northern Iowa Jazz Band One chronology
Conversations (1997)	Games (1998)	Just Us (1999)

Games is a compact disc by the University of Northern Iowa Jazz Band One recorded in the studio with one cut recorded live at the 1998 Montreux Jazz Festival. This was their 7th CD release in as many years. This group has been consistently recognized as one of the top collegiate jazz ensembles in the country having won numerous Down Beat awards and accolades from music industry professionals. "Bob Washut has a magical way with these kids. Each time I hear one of his groups, I'm even more blown way than the last time."

== Background ==
In May 1999 the Games CD was the winner of 1999 Down Beat Magazine Student Music Performance Award and also recognized in the International Association for Jazz Education Journal with International Association for Jazz Education Blue Chip Jazz Award. In January 2000, Down Beat Magazine featured an article entitled, "The Best Jazz CDs of the 90's". All CDs that received 5- and 4 1/2-star reviews in the 1990s were listed; UNI Jazz Band One was the only university big band to receive two 5-star reviews. The group toured Europe and played at the North Sea Jazz Festival and Montreux Jazz Festival in July 1998; one of the cuts from the Games CD was recorded there at Montreux. Music from Games was prominently featured in Europe during several performances.

== Track listing ==
Track Listing:

No.	Title	Length
1.	"3 in 1 Blues (Melton Mustafa)"	5:37
2.	"El Pajarito (Bob Washut)"	5:38
3.	"Games (Steve Colemen, arr. Rob Hudson)"	6:09
4.	"Easy to Love (Cole Porter, arr. Charlie Young)"	4:05
5.	"Butter (Jerry Dodgion)"	9:16
6.	"Guten Tag, Ziggaretten? (Todd Munnik)"	6:24
7.	"Somewhere (Leonard Bernstein, arr. Bob Washut)"	5:35
8.	"Giant Steps (John Coltrane, arr. Bob Washut)"	2:30
9.	"The Cage (Charles Ives, arr. Jack Cooper)"	7:56
10.	"Every Tub (Eddie Durham)"	3:07
11.	"Jeep's Blues (Johnny Hodges, arr. Duke Ellington)"	5:12
12.	"Boogie Stop Shuffle (Charles Mingus)"	5:55
Total length:		70:30

== Recording Sessions ==
- May 11/12, 1998 at Catamount Recording Studio, Cedar Falls, IA (all except track #10)
- July 6, 1998 at the Montreux Jazz Festival (track #10)

=== Musicians ===
- Director: Dr. Robert Washut
- Woodwinds: Todd Munnik, Rick Stone, Dustin Bear, Jay Ramsey, Jeff Schafer
- Trumpets: Dan Zager, Willie Garza, Eric Miller, Dave Lisik, Adam Lauritsen
- Trombones: Mike Berven, Paul Rappaport, B.J. Kleene, Andrew Pratt
- Rhythm section: Steve Shanley, acoustic and electric piano; Mike Cramer, guitar; Dave Altemeier, acoustic and electric bass; Jason Hastie, drums
- Guest soloists: Jack Graham, clarinet (Somewhere), Randy Hogancamp, vibes and percussion (El Pajarito), Sarah Barber, mezzo-soprano (The Cage), Meridie Williams, horn (Butter)

=== Production ===
- Recording engineer, mixing, and mastering: Studio - July 20/21, 1998 by Tom Tatman, Jon Chamberlain and Bob Washut. Live - Tom Barry
- Liner Notes: Robert Washut and Bobby Shew
- Cover art: Audrey Schroeder
- Photographs: Jeff Martin

== Works from the compact disc ==
The works from the compact disc are wide-ranging and reflect the eclectic and innovative teaching that Dr. Robert Washut and the UNI Music School faculty promote. Other faculty and regional artists are collaborated with on the CD to include the original version of Charles Ives' vocal work The Cage (sung by Sarah Barber) which is used as the intro to Dr. Jack Cooper's arrangement of the work for jazz orchestra. The UNI professor of clarinet Jack Graham is used as a soloist by Bob Washut on his chart on Leonard Bernstein's Somewhere. The selections Jeep's Blues (Duke Ellington) and Every Tub (Count Basie) point to the well rooted traditions of jazz taught in the curriculum at UNI. Numerous student works are featured on the recording also.

== Reception ==
Professional ratings
Review scores
Source	Rating
Down Beat; Magazine	1999 Down Beat Magazine; Student Performance Award
Down Beat; Magazine, best CDs of the 1990s	5/5 stars
All About Jazz	Very favorable
International Association for Jazz Education Journal	I.A.J.E. Blue Chip Jazz Award
