= Woodwind doubler =

Musician that plays multiple woodwind instruments

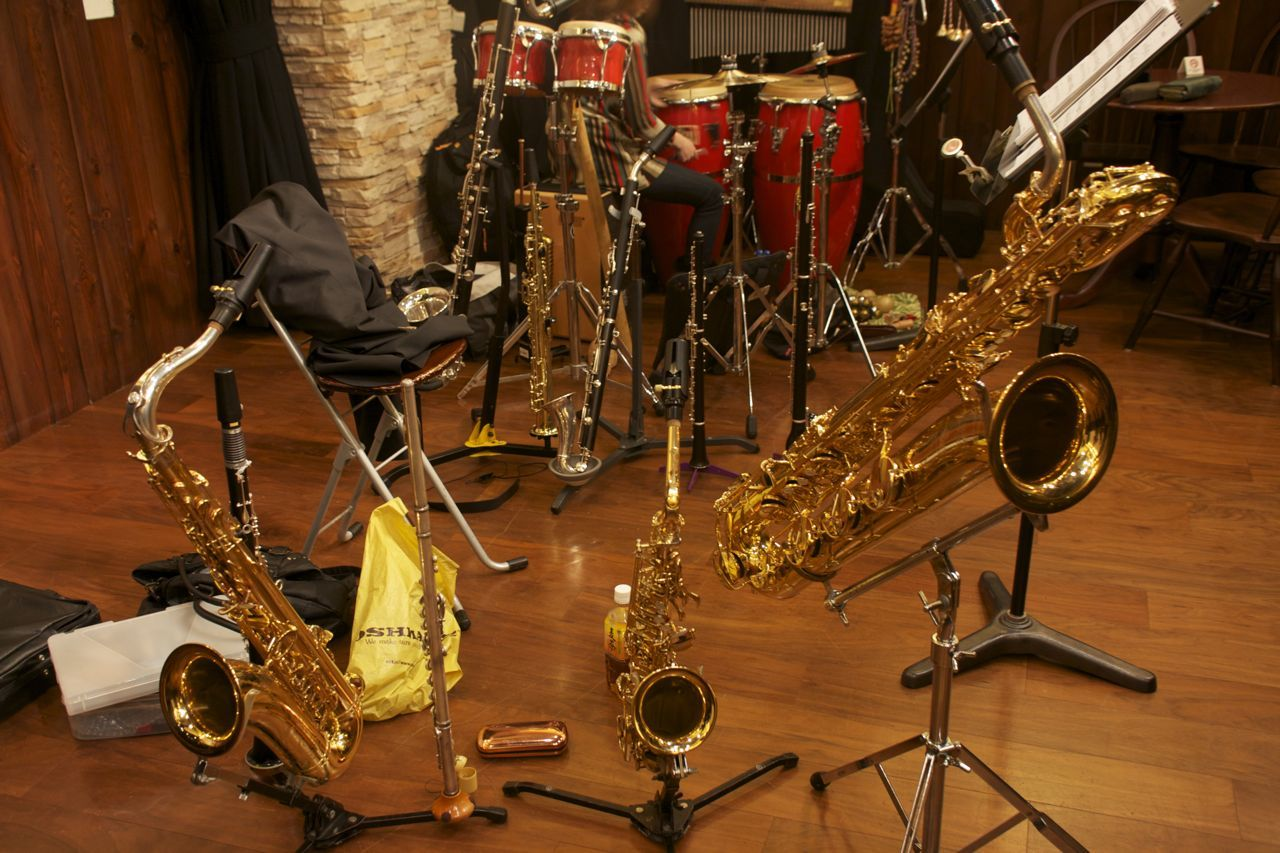
Woodwind doubler's instrument inventory: (left to right)

front: Tenor saxophone / Flute / Alto saxophone / Baritone saxophone

rear: Bass clarinet / Soprano saxophone / Alto clarinet / Oboe / English horn (Cor anglais)

A woodwind doubler (or reed doubler) is a multi-instrumentalist musician who can play instruments from more than one woodwind family (clarinets, saxophones, oboes, bassoons, flutes, or recorders). Folk or ethnic woodwind instruments (e.g. pan flute, Irish flute) may also be included in this description. A player who plays two instruments from the same family (e.g., oboe and English horn, clarinet and bass clarinet, flute and piccolo) is also sometimes called a doubler.

Longtime classical music practice has expected the non-principal player in a section to double on common auxiliary instruments: piccolo or alto flute for flutists, English horn for oboists, bass clarinet or E♭ clarinet for clarinetists. In commercial work, including Hollywood film scores and Broadway musicals, the practice evolved, with some specialists developing great expertise on instruments from several woodwind families. In such commercial work, players may be paid an additional amount for each double. Hiring four or five proficient reed doublers is still more cost-effective than hiring individual players for each instrument in the score. Even before 1940, Broadway reed players were commonly expected to double up to five instruments. The Reed III book for West Side Story (1957), for example, calls for flute, piccolo, oboe, English horn, clarinet, bass clarinet, and tenor and baritone saxophones.
