= Local Color (University of Northern Iowa Jazz Band One album) =

Studio album by University of Northern Iowa Jazz Band One
- Released: November 2015
- Recorded: May/June, 2015
- Genre: Jazz, big band
- Length: 1:07:00
- Label: UNI
- Producer: Christopher Merz

University of Northern Iowa Jazz Band One chronology
Not with THAT Attitude! (2014)	Local Color (2015)	Where the Paths Meet (2016)

Local Color is a compact disc by the University of Northern Iowa Jazz Band One produced in the recording studio at Russell Hall in the University of Northern Iowa School of Music. This is their 25th CD release in as many years. This group has been consistently recognized as one of the top collegiate jazz ensembles in the United States having won numerous Down Beat awards and accolades from music industry professionals. "..(the professors) have a magical way with these kids. Each time I hear one of (the) groups, I'm even more blown way than the last time."

== Background ==
The University of Northern Iowa Jazz Band One has a long tradition of award winning recordings with the "Local Color" CD being the 25th release in as many years. Jazz Band One was the winner of 1999 Down Beat Magazine Student Music Performance Award and also recognized in the International Association for Jazz Education Journal with Dr. Herb Wong's International Association for Jazz Education Blue Chip Jazz Award. In January 2000, Down Beat Magazine featured an article entitled, "The Best Jazz CDs of the 90's." In the article, all CDs that received 5- and 4 1/2-star reviews in the 1990s were listed; UNI Jazz Band One was the only university big band to receive two 5-star reviews that year. The group has toured Europe and Asia several times playing at the North Sea Jazz Festival and Montreux Jazz Festival's. A great deal of student and alumni composition rounds out the selections of the CD, Amur In Her Heart was a special commission presented to the group which features guest artists Michael Conrad (organ), Justin Kisor (trumpet), and Mitra Sadeghpour (vocalise).

== Track listing ==
Track Listing:

No.	Title	Length
1.	"Gerry's Timepiece (Michael Conrad)"	6:17
2.	"Fee Fi Fo Fum (Wayne Shorter, arr. Paul Lichty)"	8:25
3.	"I Broke The Dam (Brian Crew)"	9:15
4.	"Amur In Her Heart for Oksana (Jack Cooper)"	8:07
5.	"Freedom Jazz Dance (Eddie Harris, arr. Troy Thompson)"	7:49
6.	"Mirage (Rick Hirsch)"	10:17
7.	"My Ship (Kurt Weill & Ira Gershwin, arr. Nick Lane)"	5:47
8.	"The Egyptian (Curtis Fuller, arr. Paul Lichty)"	10:22
Total length:		1:07:00

== Recording Sessions ==
- May/June, 2015 at the Russell Hall recording studio, University of Northern Iowa, Cedar Falls, IA

=== Musicians ===
- Director: Christopher Merz
- Saxophones/Woodwinds: Ryan Middleton, Sam Bills, Sean Koga, Mark Northrup, Mason Meyers
- Trumpets: Dan Meier, Andrew Teutsch, Ryan Garmoe, Jordan Boehm, Michael Prichard
- Trombones: Brian Crew, Paul Lichty, Brent Mead, Thomas Rauch
- Rhythm section: Seth Butler, acoustic and electric piano; Elvis Phillips, guitar; Riley Scheetz, acoustic and electric bass; Chris Jensen, drums; Patrick Cunningham, vibraphone and percussion
- Guest soloists: Michael Conrad, organ; Justin Kisor, trumpet; Mitra Sadeghpour, voice (all on Amur in Her Heart)

=== Production ===
- Producer and mixing: Christopher Merz
- Recording engineer, mixing, and mastering: Tom Barry
- Cover art, layout and design: Zac Lane

== Works from the compact disc ==
The works from the compact disc are wide ranging and reflect the eclectic and innovative teaching that Chris Merz and the UNI Music School professors promote. Other faculty and internationally acclaimed artists are collaborated with on the CD (to include vocalize sung by Dr. Mitra Sadeghpour). All the selections point to the well rooted traditions of jazz taught in the curriculum at the UNI School of Music. Numerous student works are featured on the recording also.

== Critical reception and professional ratings ==
Professional ratings
Review scores
Source	Rating
All About Jazz	#1 of Top 25 "Recommended" Album Reviews; 2016

"The band as a whole is exemplary, and director Chris Merz deserves three cheers for having his young charges primed and ready to face the erraticisms of the recording studio. In sum, Local Color proves a worthy addition to UNI's expanding catalog of admirable recordings."

Jack Bowers, senior contributor, All About Jazz
