= Double Helix (music composition) =

1991 jazz composition

- Cover for score and parts

Composition by Jack Cooper
- Released: 1995
- Recorded: 1993
- Studio: Omega Recording, Rockville, Maryland
- Genre: Jazz, blues
- Composer: Jack Cooper

"Double Helix" is an original music composition written by Jack Cooper for 17-piece jazz orchestras in 1991. The recording of "Double Helix" also goes by the title "Twice is Nice" (as a sound file) when distributed worldwide as production music. The work has been used and heard around the world for music, media, and entertainment broadcasts.

== Background ==
Double Helix was first written in 1991 as a commission for the SCSBOA Honor Jazz Ensemble and premiered at Disneyland that year. Late in 1991 Jack Bullock (jazz editor for Columbia Pictures Publications/ Belwin) hired Jack Cooper as a staff writer for new jazz ensemble works. Jack Bullock heard his writing done for the U.S. Army Jazz Knights. The first piece Bullock decided to publish (and record) was Double Helix.

The work was recorded at Omega Recording Studios in Rockville, Maryland for the 1993 CPP/Belwin Jazz catalogue of new published works. Later In 1994, Canadian beverage giant Seagram bought a part of Time Warner and the Warner Music Publishing division of that company acquired CPP/Belwin. Double Helix was now distributed by Warner Brothers Music publications and the company made the move to allow FirstCom and Universal Publishing Production Music to have access to a limited number of CPP/Belwin sound files. The recordings from Omega Studios for CPP/Belwin were of very high quality as well as the music itself that was being written and acquired for the catalogue.

While the original CPP/Belwin sound file of Double Helix continues to be widely used in the media, the rights to the print music were acquired back by the composer in 2006. The print music division of Time Warner was sold to Alfred Music Publishing in June 2005 which made a great deal of the older CPP/Belwin print music catalogue obsolete. At that time it was best to move Double Helix (the print music) to a company who would keep the work in distribution for a much longer period; the print music is now distributed and sold by Really Good Music Publishing.

The music and sound file of Double Helix has been and is still frequently utilized for media production in television and radio. The ASCAP distributions have far exceeded the original royalty payments made through sale of the print music by CPP/Belwin.

== Composition ==
The work itself is 170 measures and based on a Blues form in the key of f minor. The smaller 12 measure sub-form repeats numerous times; the overall work mimics a hybrid Sonata form with an exposition/statement, development (with improvisation section), and recap (or restatement).

=== The form and layout of Double Helix ===
Double Helix

Measures; 1-12	13–48	49–64	77–88	89–112	113–124	125–144	145–156	157–170
Introduction	statement melody/song	interlude send off	open improvisation/ background figures	saxophone section soli	stop time Acappella brass	development	recap of melody/song	coda/Finé

== Reviews ==
Professional ratings
Review scores
Source	Rating
Band Directors Guide (BD Guide)	(*)The Very Best

"Aptly titled, this original work spirals its way into the world of contemporary big band swing music. The voicing selections are superb. It comes off sounding much more difficult than it actually is...The driving into the head (section) set(s) up the soloist, who emerges with a roar from the full ensemble scoring...The shout chorus is memorable and, like the rest of the chart, it contains terrific dynamic contrasts."

— Dick Dunscomb BD Guide (review, 1993)

== Use in media ==
"Double Helix" has been used as feature, interlude, and background music in the United Kingdom, the Czech Republic, the Netherlands, Ireland, Canada, Romania, France, Norway, Finland, Hong Kong, and Japan.

Television shows using the work include The Jenny Jones Show, F.Y.E., E! Entertainment shows (2), Access Hollywood, JBVO: Your All Request Cartoon Show, American Restoration, Deal or No Deal (UK), and Extra.
