= Planet Arts Records =

American jazz record label

- Founded: 1997
- Founder: Tom Bellino
- Distributors: Amazon, iTunes
- Genre: Jazz
- Country of origin: U.S.
- Location: Catskill, New York
- Official website: www.planetarts.org

Planet Arts Records is a Grammy and ASCAP award-winning record label and arts organization. Started by Tom Bellino, they are a not-for-profit 501(c) 3 company dedicated to working with artists, educators, and cultural organizations on the development, production and documentation of culturally important projects related to jazz and art music. Most notably they have produced CDs from the Vanguard Jazz Orchestra which have been nominated for Grammys and won for Best Large Ensemble Album in 2009.

== Initiatives and recordings ==
The Planet Arts DoAM (Documentation of American Music) initiative focuses on large ensemble projects, documenting important American music compositions of established, mid-career and emerging composers. While independent and large-scale projects are often overlooked by major and independent record labels, Planet Arts Recordings mission has provided an outlet for artists to document their work. Numerous projects have been recorded under this initiative to include several albums by the Vanguard Jazz Orchestra. Two new American music releases deal with the music of Bob Brookmeyer and also large jazz orchestra adaptations of Charles Ives music on the CD Mists: Charles Ives for Jazz Orchestra.

== Recognition ==
The list of jazz artists for Planet Arts Records includes Jimmy Heath, Slide Hampton, Luis Bonilla, Jim McNeely, Jack Cooper, the Vanguard Jazz Orchestra, and many more.

Numerous releases on the label have been nominated for Grammy awards, including Turn Up The Heath, Past Present & Future, Can I Persuade You?, The Music of Jim McNeely, and Over Time: Music of Bob Brookmeyer.

== See also ==
- List of record labels
