= JazzWeek =

Weekly magazine on jazz music

JazzWeek is a jazz magazine that was co-founded by Ed Trefzger in August 2001. Jazzweek publishes industry news and a weekly top 100 ranking of music played by jazz radio stations.

== Collection Method ==
Originally, the company gathered its own data directly from radio stations, but then switched to Mediaguide, Inc. reporting until that company went out of business in February 2012. From that month onward, JazzWeek returned to doing its own data collection.

JazzWeek publishes weekly jazz radio airplay charts and posts an annual spreadsheet of recordings released during the previous 12 months.

== Events ==
Since 2002, with the exception of 2006, the publication hosts JazzWeek Summit, where jazz radio stations and record labels with jazz artists gather for a three-day trade conference. All but two were hosted in Rochester, New York, where the magazine is published, while the 2005 Summit was in Syracuse, New York, and the 2012 Summit was in Detroit.
