= Strangers in the Night – The Music of Bert Kaempfert =

Video by Berlin Jazz Orchestra
- Released: September 12, 2012
- Recorded: recorded live February 12, 2008 at Alte Oper in Frankfurt, Germany
- Genre: Jazz, Pop Music
- Length: 65 Minutes
- Label: Polydor/Universal

Berlin Jazz Orchestra chronology
You're Everything (2008)	Strangers in the Night – The Music of Bert Kaempfert (2012)	Songs of Berlin (2021)

Strangers in the Night – The Music of Bert Kaempfert is the Berlin Jazz Orchestra's first home video, released on DVD September 21, 2012 by Polydor/Universal Entertainment. The DVD is a live recording from the Alte Oper on February 12, 2008 in Frankfurt, Germany.

== History ==
Strangers in the Night – The Music of Bert Kaempfert is the Berlin Jazz Orchestra's first home video, released on DVD September 21, 2012. This was produced using a big band, strings and choir, playing the music of Kaempfert's and conducted by former alumni, trombonist Jiggs Whigham. The DVD documents and is an edited production of one of four concerts the Berlin Jazz Orchestra performed in early 2008. The particular concert documented/presented on the DVD is a live recording and video from Frankfurt, Germany at the Alte Oper on February 12, 2008.

On DVD the recording includes Kaempfert’s well known songs such as Spanish Eyes, Wonderland By Night, You Turned My World Around and Strangers in the Night. Soloists included Ack van Rooyen (flugelhorn, trumpet), Herb Geller (saxophone, flute), Jiggs Whigham (trombone) and Ladi Geisler (bass) together with several of Bert Kaempfert’s past musicians from his orchestras. This concert and DVD includes jazz singers Sylvia Vrethammar, Marc Secara as well as pianist and entertainer Joja Wendt.

== Promotion ==
The live recording for Polydor Records originated from the concert of February 12, 2008 at the Alte Oper in Frankfurt, Germany. The concert/DVD was toured in four different German cities to Include Berlin, Frankfurt, Düsseldorf and Hamburg. Follow up to this CD is Now and Forever - Secara meets Kaempfert released by Silver Spot Records in 2011.

== Reception/Professional ratings ==
Professional ratings
Review scores
Source	Rating
Jazzthetic (Germany)	Highly favorable

A whirring sound carpet is laid down by the Berlin Jazz Orchestra (sic)...
made impressive for provoking a renewable generation of Jazz.

Dresdner Neueste Nachrichten

The young singer Marc Secara would actually stand where Roger Cicero is today, because he has it (to make it short).

Jazzthetic

== Track listing ==
Disc 1
No.	Title	Length
1.	"Intro: Strangers in the Night"	00:43
2.	"Wonderland By Night"	03:04
3.	"Medley: Afrikaan Beat / A Swingin' Safari / Red Roses for a Blue Lady / Three O'Clock in the Morning"	05:52
4.	"For Bert"	04:40
5.	"The Sunny Side of Life"	04:10
6.	"The World We Knew"	03:07
7.	"Spanish Eyes (Moon over Naples)"	05:08
8.	"L.O.V.E"	04:03
9.	"It Makes No Difference"	03:32
10.	"Lonely Is the Name"	04:37
11.	"Bye Bye Blues"	03:08
12.	"I Love You So"	02:50
13.	"A Song for Satch"	02:40
14.	"Strangers in the Night"	04:22
15.	"You Turned My World Around"	02:51
16.	"(You Are) My Way of Life"	03:00
17.	"The Times Will Change"	02:54
18.	"Danke Schoen"	04:50

== Personnel ==
- Conductor – Jiggs Whigham
- Arranged By – Bert Kaempfert, Herbert Rehbein, Jörg Achim Keller
- Contractor – Maraike Niemz
- Trombone (solo) - Jiggs Whigham
- Trumpet and flugelhorn (solo) – Ack van Rooyen
- Guitar and bass (solo) - Ladi Geisler
- Featured vocalists – Marc Secara, Sylvia Vrethammar
- Alto Saxophone and flute– Herb Geller, Nico Lohmann
- Tenor Saxophone and flute – Patrick Braun, Thomas Walter
- Baritone Saxophone and flute – Grégoire Peters
- Trumpet – Daniel Collette, Jürgen Hahn, Martin Gerwig, Nikolaus Neuser
- Trombone – Arne Fischer, Christoph Hermann, Ralph Zickerick, Simon Harrer
- Guitar – Jeanfrançois Prins
- Piano – Claus-Dieter Bandorf, Joja Wendt
- Bass – Ralph Graessler
- Drums – Jean Paul Hochstädter
- Strings – Frankfurt Strings
- Backing Vocalists – Esther Kaiser, Kristofer Benn, Sarah Kaiser

== Release history ==
Region	Date	Label	Format
Europe	September 21, 2012	Universal Polydor	DVD
Canada	September 21, 2012	Universal Polydor	DVD
