= David Horler =

English jazz trombonist (born 1943)

David Ronald Horler (born 10 September 1943) is an English jazz trombonist. He is the older brother of John Horler and the father of Cascada lead singer Natalie Horler.

== Biography ==
Horler was born in Lymington, Hampshire. His father was a professional trumpeter. David studied piano from age five and trombone from age 14, and attended the Royal Academy of Music from 1963 to 1966. Following his graduation he played with the BBC Radio Orchestra (1967–70), then played freelance in London orchestras, including those conducted by Leonard Bernstein, Quincy Jones, and Michel Legrand. He moved to Cologne in 1980, playing in the WDR Big Band, also composing and arranging for the group. As a sideman, he has played with Maynard Ferguson, Stan Getz, Tony Bennett, Bob Brookmeyer, Mike Gibbs, Clark Terry, Kenny Wheeler, Carmen McRae, and Jim McNeely. He was made an associate of the Royal Academy of Music in 1992.

=== Personal life ===
Of his five children, one of his four daughters is Natalie Horler, the lead singer in the Eurodance band Cascada.

== Discography ==
=== As leader ===
- Rolling Down 7th with Ludwig Nus (Mons, 2006)

=== As sideman ===
With WDR Big Band Koln

- Caribbean Night (BHM, 1997)
- NiedeckenKoeln (Capitol/EMI, 2004)
- Blues & Beyond (BHM, 2007)
- The World of Duke Ellington Vol. 1 (BHM, 2008)
- The World of Duke Ellington Vol. 2 (BHM, 2008)
- The World of Duke Ellington Vol. 3 (BHM, 2008)
- Celebrating Billie Holiday (CMO Jazz, 2008)
- Christmas Revisited (Jazzline, 2013)

With Kenny Wheeler

- Song for Someone (Incus, 1973)
- Music for Large & Small Ensembles (ECM, 1990)
- Kayak (Ah Um, 1992)
- The Long Waiting (CAM Jazz, 2012)

With others

- Patti Austin, For Ella (Playboy, 2002)
- Bob Brookmeyer, Electricity (ACT, 1994)
- Tony Coe, Allan Ganley, Malcolm Creese, Blue Jersey (ABCDs, 1995)
- Phil Collins, Live at Montreux 2004 (Eagle/Montreux 2012)
- Karen Cheryl, Karen Cheryl (Ibach, 1978)
- John Dankworth, Full Circle (Philips, 1972)
- John Dankworth, Movies 'n' Me (RCA, 1974)
- Peter Dennis, Back to the Bands (Telefunken, 1974)
- Peter Dennis, Peter Dennis Presents Big Band Boogie Woogie (Telefunken, 1975)
- Peter Erskine, Behind Closed Doors Vol. 1 (Fuzzy Music, 1998)
- Bill Evans, Vans Joint (BHM, 2008)
- Albert Finney, Albert Finney's Album (Motown, 1977)
- Michael Gibbs, Michael Gibbs (Deram, 1970)
- Michael Gibbs, Tanglewood 63 (Deram, 1971)
- Michael Gibbs, Directs the Only Chrome-Waterfall Orchestra (Bronze, 1975)
- Paul Gonsalves, Humming Bird (Deram, 1970)
- George Gruntz, Cosmopolitan Greetings (MGB, 1993)
- Eddie Harris, The Last Concert (ACT, 1997)
- Tubby Hayes, 200% Proof (Master Mix, 1992)
- Tubby Hayes, Rumpus (Savage Solweig, 2015)
- Peter Herbolzheimer, Bigband Bebop (Koala, 1984)
- Peter Herbolzheimer, Music for Swinging Dancers Vol. 3 (Teldec, 1984)
- Abdullah Ibrahim, Bombella (Intuition/Sunnyside, 2009)
- Joachim Kuhn, Daniel Humair, Carambolage (CMP, 1992)
- Bireli Lagrene, Djangology (Dreyfus, 2006)
- Syd Lawrence, At Your Request Vol. 2 (Beech Park, 1980)
- Michel Legrand, Suites from Umbrellas of Cherbourg and Go-Between (CBS, 1979)
- Heike Makatsch, Hilde (Warner, 2009)
- The Manhattan Transfer, Live (Atlantic, 1978)
- Mendoza & Mardin Project, Jazzpana (ACT, 1993)
- Airto Moreira, Gil Evans, WDR Big Band, Misa Espiritual Airto's Brazilian Mass Deutsche (Harmonia Mundi, 1983)
- New York Voices, Live (Palmetto, 2012)
- Maceo Parker, Roots & Grooves (Intuition, 2007)
- Brian Protheroe, I/You (Chrysalis, 1976)
- Bernard Purdie, Bernard Purdie's Soul to Jazz (ACT, 1996)
- Daryl Runswick & Tony Hymas, Big Bands 1974–1978 (ASC, 2019)
- Helen Schneider, Right as the Rain (Tomato, 1995)
- John Scofield, Jim McNeely, Marc Johnson, East Coast Blow Out (Lipstick, 1991)
- Lalo Schifrin, Gillespiana in Cologne (Aleph, 1998)
- Lalo Schifrin, Latin Jazz Suite (Aleph, 1999)
- Marc Secara, Now and Forever (Silver Spot, 2011)
- Gary Shearston, The Greatest Stone On Earth and Other Two-Bob Wonders (Charisma, 1975)
- Markus Stockhausen, Jubilee (EMI, 1996)
- Clark Terry, Clark After Dark (MPS, 1978)
- Gianluigi Trovesi, Dedalo (Enja, 2002)
- Caterina Valente, Kurt Weill American Songs (Bear Family, 2000)
- Sunny Wheetman, The Best of the Woman in Me (Young, 1979)
- Jiggs Whigham, Bill Holman, Mel Lewis, The Third Stone (Koala, 1982)
- Phil Woods, I Remember (Gryphon, 1979)
- Michael Zager, Life's a Party (Private Stock, 1979)
- Joe Zawinul, WDR Big Band, Brown Street (Intuition, 2006)
