= Time Frames =

2021 studio album by Michael Waldrop

Studio album by Michael Waldrop
- Released: February 26, 2021
- Recorded: Spokane, Washington; Los Angeles, California; Indianapolis, Indiana; Memphis, Tennessee
- Genre: Jazz; classical; instrumental
- Length: 1:04:02
- Label: Origin Classical 33025
- Producer: John Bishop

Michael Waldrop chronology
| Origin Suite (2018) | Time Frames (2021) |

Time Frames is a 2021 album by Michael Waldrop, his third release with Origin Records. The recording is a crossover from classical to new music, jazz, minimalism and world music. The album was chosen for the 2021 AllMusic Guide Top 50 List of Classical Recordings.

== Background ==
With two successful large ensemble, jazz recordings completed with Origin Records (Time Within Itself and Origin Suite), Michael Waldrop contracted with the label for the third release. The primary aim of the album was to focus of Waldrop's prowess as a classic mallet virtuoso. Several of Waldrop's musical compositions made up the core of the album repertoire and several new works were commissioned for the project. Funding for Time Frames was provided by a University of Eastern Washington Faculty Research and Creative Work Fund (FRCW) grant (third FRCW grant Waldrop received). Completed primary during the COVID-19 pandemic, remote recording was done in Los Angeles, Indianapolis and Memphis, Tennessee. Time Frames was chosen for the 2021 AllMusic Guide Top 50 List for Classical Recordings.

"Time Frames" features the marimba, its origins as an African percussion instrument and also includes jazz improvisation as a key element in the musical works/recording. Along with Waldrop, other established musicians are included on the release such as Gordon Stout, Brad Dutz, Jose Rossy and Marko Djordjevic. Jack Cooper's Three Mediterranean Views was specifically written for the Origin Records release. Music on the recording covers a wide cross section of influences from jazz, classical, minimalism, popular music and numerous other genres.

== Reception ==
Time Frames garnered numerous favorable reviews to include AllMusic, All About Jazz and the Percussive Arts Society.

"Although there are some passages where (two) drummers are playing in unison, the fusion of improvised and precomposed music is seamless. Time Frames reveals an unseen facet of Waldrop's musical individuality."

- R.J. Lambert, All Music Guide

"Easy to appreciate, hard to categorize and impossible to ignore, Time Frames is a testament to one exceptional percussionist's determination, skill and creative vision."

- Dan Bilawsky, All About Jazz

Professional ratings
Review scores
| Source | Rating |
|---|---|
| All Music Guide | Best of 2015 (classical) |
| All About Jazz | Very favorable |
| Tom Hull | B+(***) |
| Percussive Notes | Very favorable |
| Take Effect | 8/10 stars |
| Jazz Weekly | Very favorable |
| Midwest Record | Very favorable |

== Track listing ==
1. "Fractals 2:24
2. "Dem Dakar (Parables)" 6:11
3. "Three Mediterranean Views: León de Palamidi" 3:08
4. "Three Mediterranean Views: Notte a Venezia" 3:16
5. "Three Mediterranean Views: Château d'If" 3:24
6. "Almost Beyond" 5:24
7. "Delineations" 5:29
8. "Katrina's Path: Brazil" 2:28
9. "Katrina's Path: Cuba" 1:35
10. "Katrina's Path: New Orleans" 2:59
11. "Hollow" 7:00
12. "Sixth Chakra" 3:50
13. "Incoming" 9:34
14. "Tortoise Efficiency" 4:19
15. "Continuity" 3:01

Music composed by Michael Waldrop except:

- (3-5) Jack Cooper
- (6) Nathan Daughtrey
- (11) Jonathan Middleton
- (13) Gordon Stout
- (14) Brad Dutz

== Personnel ==
- Michael Waldrop - marimba (1,2,3,5,6,11,14) vibraphone (4), drum set (8-10,12,13) keyboard sequencing (1,2,7,12,15)
- Jose Rossy - Djembe, Djun Djuns, Shekere and miscellaneous percussion (1,2,7,12,15)
- Brad Dutz - bongos, congas, doumbek, riq, percussion (1,3-5,14)
- Steve Snyder - piano (3-5)
- Alex Pershounin - acoustic bass (3,5)
- Sam Shoup - acoustic bass (4)
- Ivana Cojbasic - acoustic piano (6)
- Marko Djordjevic - drum set (10)
- Gordon Stout - marimba (13)

Production

- John Bishop - Executive producer, cover photo, design and layout
- Michael Waldrop, Tim Reppert - producers
- Tim Reppert - mixing, Boston, MA
- Scott Kinsey - mastering, Los Angeles, CA
- Jordan Lewis - Waldrop photos
- Phillip Mawarire - Zimbabwean Shona sculpture ("The Drummer")
- Michael Lewis (*1,2,7,12,15) Marimba - Recorded by , Song Mill Studio, Hayden, ID; July, 2020
- Percussion - Recorded by Jimi Tunnell, Buffalo Sound, Denton, TX; Nov, 2020
- (3-6) Marimba / Piano / Vibes - Recorded by SaCha MÜller, Dead Aunt Thelma's Studio, Portland, OR Dec, 2020
- (3-5) Percussion - Recorded by Brad Dutz, Los Angeles, CA / Piano - Recorded by Alan Johnson, Static Shack, Indianapolis, IN
- Bass - Recorded by Travis Huisman, Catamount Recording. Cedar Falls, IA; Nov, 2020
- (4) Bass - Recorded by Matt Tutor, Bloodworth Studio, Memphis, TN
- (8-10) Recorded by Steve Gamberoni, SFCC, Spokane, WA; Jan, 2019
- (11) Recorded by Shawn Trail, EWU Recital Hall, Cheney, WA; June 2020
- (13) Recorded by Tim Reppert, REP Studio, Ithaca, NY; Dec, 2005
- (14) Recorded by Wayne Peet, KillZone Studio, Los Angeles, CA; August 2010

== Charts ==
| Year | Chart | Type | Song/Album | Peak position | Chart date |
|---|---|---|---|---|---|
| 2021 | JazzWeek Airplay Reporting | Album | Time Frames | 152 | May 24, 2021 |

== Release history ==
| Region | Date | Label | Format |
|---|---|---|---|
| United States | February 26, 2021 | Origin Classical | CD, digital download |
| Europe and U.K. | September 3, 2021 | Challenge Records | CD, digital download |

== See also ==
- Gordon Stout
- Jack Cooper
