= Freelance Records =

Freelance Records existed during the 1980s and 1990s and released jazz albums on LP and CD. Some of these albums were reissued on Evidence Records.

== Discography ==
FRL	Artist	Title	Rec.
001	Cheik Tidiane Fall	Diom Futa	1979
002	Marion Brown Quartet	Back to Paris	1980
003	Curtis Clark	Dedications	1981
004	Richard Raux Quartet	Feel Good At Last	1983
005	Steve McCraven Quartet featuring Sam Rivers	Intertwining Spirits	1983
006	Mal Waldron/Marion Brown	Songs of Love and Regret	1985
007	Roy Haynes Quartet	True or False	1986
008	Santi Debriano Quintet	Obeah	1987
009	Judy Niemack, Curtis Fuller, Cedar Walton, Ray Drummond, Joey Baron	Blue Bop	1988
010	Mal Waldron/Marion Brown	Much More	1988
011	David Kikoski/Eddie Gómez/Al Foster	Presage	1989
012	Santi Debriano	Soldiers of Fortune	1989
014	Judy Niemack, Joe Lovano, Fred Hersch, Scott Colley, Billy Hart	Long As You're Living	1990
015	Cindy Blackman/Santi Debriano/David Fiuczynski	Trio + Two	1990
016	Steve Lacy/Eric Watson	Spirit of Mingus	1991
017	Bruce Gertz Quintet	Blueprint	1991
018	Judy Niemack, Toots Thielemans, Jeanfrançois Prins, Kenny Werner, Scott Colley, Adam Nussbaum, Café, Mark Feldman, Theo Bleckmann, Peter Eldridge	Straight Up	1992
019	Santi Debriano, David Sánchez, David Kikoski, Tommy Campbell, Mino Cinelu	Panamaniacs	1993
020	Franck Amsallem/Tim Ries Quartet	Regards	1993
021	Judy Niemack, Mal Waldron	Mingus, Monk and Mal	1994
022	Eliot Zigmund/David Berkman/Mike Richmond	Dark Street	1993
023	Eric Watson Trio	Punk Circus	1994
024	Yoron Israel Connection	A Gift for You	1995
025	Steve Lacy Trio	Bye-Ya	1996
026	Judy Niemack, Jeanfrançois Prins, Kenny Werner, Ray Drummond, Billy Hart, Erik Friedlander	Night and the Music	1996
027	Scott Colley	Portable Universe	1996
