= Michael Waldrop =

American musician

Michael Van Waldrop
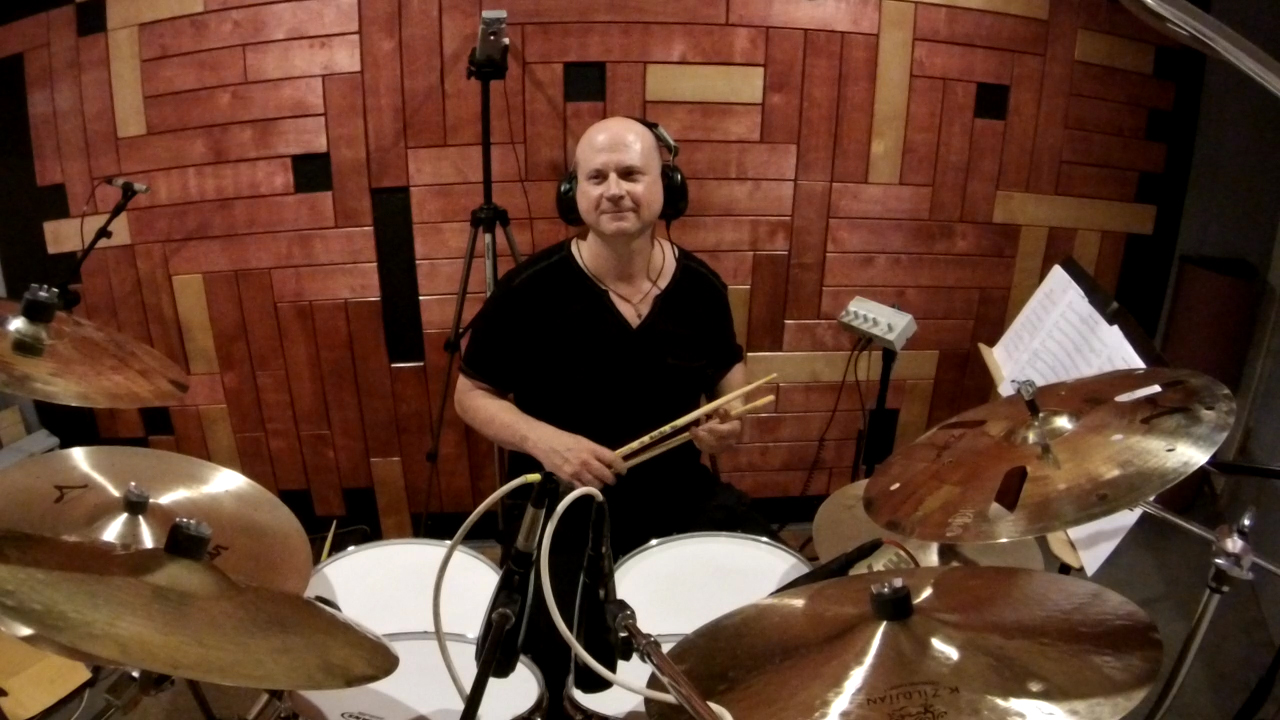

Background information
- Also known as: Mike Waldrop
- Born: Michael Van Waldrop; October 2, 1961 (age 64); Pensacola, Florida, United States
- Origin: Ithaca, New York, United States
- Genres: Fusion; Classical; Bop; Big band Swing; Symphonic jazz
- Occupations: Percussionist, Composer, Music Producer, Educator
- Instruments: Drums, Percussion, Vibraphone and Piano
- Years active: 1979–present
- Labels: Origin; Centaur
- Formerly of: One O'Clock Lab Band; Michael Waldrop Big Band
- Website: www.michaelwaldrop.net

Michael Waldrop (Née Michael Van Waldrop, October 1, 1961) is an American drummer, percussionist, composer and music educator. He is notable as a virtuoso percussionist in both jazz and classical idioms, with equal focus on drumset and keyboard percussion (marimba/vibraphone). Since 2014, he has been a recording artist for Origin Records.

== Early life, musical education and influences ==
=== Atlanta, Ithaca and University of North Texas ===
Michael Waldrop grew up in Atlanta, Georgia listening to the radio and popular music. He showed an aptitude for drumming along with music which lead to parents purchasing him a small drum-set at age 4. He later moved to Ithaca, New York in 1970. In 1974, he heard and met Buddy Rich who made a tremendous impression on Waldrop. His first music studies were with Richard Lajza, and private mentorship with Bill Youhass and Gordon Stout. During his time with Stout in Ithaca, Waldrop studied marimba and vibraphone. By the age of 17, Waldrop started playing professionally on drum set and within a year was with fusion guitarist David Torn.

After graduating high school, Waldrop was accepted to the University of North Texas College of Music. He studied with Robert Schietroma, Ron Fink, Ed Soph, Henry Okstel, Kal Cherry, Michael Carney, and Gregg Bissonette. Waldrop performed with notable jazz artists such as Dan Haerle, Michael Cain, Bob Belden and Jay Saunders. After completing his undergraduate work at UNT, Waldrop returned to the New York area and performed extensively. He played in Caprice Fox’s group for almost a year and freelanced with a long list of others. At this time, Waldrop was to make an important artistic connection with fusion guitarist Jimi Tunnell.

== Professional career ==
=== Memphis, Chicago, international touring ===
In 1987, Waldrop started to take his master's degree in jazz performance at the University of Memphis where he studied with jazz pianist Gene Rush. In the Mid-South, he performed with Phineas Newborn, Della Reese, Frank Gambale, Eliane Elias, Randy Brecker, Kathy Kosins and Marvin Stamm. In 1989, Waldrop recorded the movie soundtrack of Christmas Vacation. During this time, he also studied with drummer Keith Copeland. Waldrop later taught jazz percussion and jazz theory at the University of Memphis. He continues to perform and record with the Jazz Orchestra of the Delta and has a close musical relationship with composer/arranger Jack Cooper.

After completion of his master's degree in 1990, Waldrop relocated to Chicago and worked strictly as a performer in the Chicago metropolitan area. He played on ads for the likes of Pillsbury and other companies. He performed with a long list of prominent jazz artists in Chicago, which included saxophonist Mike Smith and jazz violinist Johnny Frigo. In early 1992, Waldrop accepted a position with the international touring company of 42nd Street. He spent much of 1992 and 1993 performing in Italy, Germany, and the Netherlands with that show.

=== Professional work since 1993 ===
Waldrop accepted a Doctoral fellowship to the University of North Texas College of Music in 1993 and completed the coursework for the Doctor of Musical Arts in 1996. His degree was completed in 1999 with a specialization on marimba. During Waldrop's second tenure in Denton, Texas he played, toured and recorded with the Grammy nominated UNT One O'Clock Lab Band. He can be heard on the recordings Lab 94, Standard Time and Fifty Years.

Since 1993 Waldrop has performed on drum set and multiple percussion instruments with a lengthy roster of artists including Jon Hendricks, Tim Ries, Rich Perry, Greg Gisbert and Wayne Horvitz. In 1999 he toured the Middle East with internationally acclaimed composer Kamran Ince. From 1999–2004, while in Colorado, he was Principal Percussionist with the Grand Junction Symphony as well as director of the Western Colorado Jazz Orchestra. From 2006-2009 he served as the drummer for the Bob Curnow Big Band; Waldrop's drumming is heard on the Curnow's critically acclaimed CD The Music of Pat Metheny and Lyle Mays - Volume II. Waldrop currently works extensively in the Northwest region of United States as both a commercial, classical and jazz artist. The Michael Waldrop Big Band was featured at the international Jazz Educator's Network(JEN) conventions in JEN 2016 (Louisville) and JEN 2019 (Reno).

=== Origin Records recording artist ===
Since 2014 Waldrop has been a recording artist for Origin Records. Most notable are his two CD's with Origin entitled Time Within Itself and Origin Suite. Both recordings have been reviewed internationally in Down Beat, Jazz Journal, the IAJRC Journal as well as many other periodicals; both were fixtures on the JazzWeek radio airplay charts in 2015 and in 2018. Waldrop plays drum set and vibraphone on the two releases.

==== Time Within Itself ====
The Time Within Itself CD was premiered in Memphis, Tennessee on March 7, 2015 by the Jazz Orchestra of the Delta. The album had its Northwest U.S. premiere on July 27, 2015 at Tula's Jazz Club in Seattle, Washington. The album was also performed at the Jazz Education Network International Conference in Louisville, Kentucky on January 9, 2016 which included guest artists Brad Dutz and Billy Hulting. The music from the Time Within Itself CD has acquired significant international recognition. The Swingin' Paradise Jazz Orchestra in Tokyo, Japan performed Tunnell Vision on July 18, 2016 at Musasino Big Band Jazz Festival. Drumhead Magazine published a two part feature of transcribed solos and drum parts from the Time Within Itself CD starting with the June 2015 (#50) edition. Origin Records submitted the Time Within itself CD into the first round ballot of the 58th Annual Grammy Awards for the categories of Best Arrangement Instrumental or a Cappella, Best Large Jazz Ensemble Album, and Best Instrumental Composition.

==== Origin Suite ====
Unlike Time Within Itself, Origin Suite (CD) is a more fusion oriented." Notable music reviewer Brian Morton gave Origin Suite 4 of 5 stars in his Jazz Journal review (U.K.). Morton writes, "...It's remarkable how seamless and entire it all sounds. A very impressive project and one to shelve among the keepers, alongside Waldrop's fine earlier Time Within Itself.". Origin Records submitted the Time Within itself CD into the first round ballot of the 61st Annual Grammy Awards for the categories of Best Large Jazz Ensemble Album, Best Instrumental Composition and Best Album Engineering.

== Teaching and education career ==
Michael Waldrop has been teaching at the collegiate level for over the past 20 years. From 1999 to 2004 he held a full-time teaching position at Mesa State College in Grand Junction, Colorado. In 2004 Waldrop accepted a position as Professor of Percussion at the University of Toledo and was there until 2006. Since 2006 Waldrop has held the position of Director of Percussion Studies at Eastern Washington University. Waldrop is an educational clinician/artist for Yamaha and the Vic Firth Company making appearances throughout the United States. His compositions are published by Drop6 Media through Row-loff Publishing.

== Select discography ==
=== As leader or featured artist ===
- 2025 Native Son (Origin)
- 2021 Time Frames (Origin Classical)
- 2019 Triangularity reissue with Bonus Tracks - Michael Waldrop (CD Baby)
- 2018 Origin Suite - Michael Waldrop (Origin)
- 2015 Time Within Itself - Michael Waldrop Big Band (Origin)
- 2002 Triangularity - Michael Waldrop (Rhythmworks)

=== As sideman or composer ===
- 2021 Songs of Berlin - Berlin Jazz Orchestra (GAM)
- 2014 Welcome to Stoutland - Gordon Stout and Friends (Resonator)
- 2011 The Music of Pat Metheny and Lyle Mays: Vol II - Bob Curnow Big Band (Sierra Records)
- 2011 Live At The Levitt Shell - Jazz Orchestra of the Delta (JOD)
- 2010 The Chamber Wind Music of Jack Cooper - Jack Cooper (Centaur)
- 2007 Voices (Select-O-Hits)
- 1997 Fifty Years - North Texas Jazz (UNT Jazz)
- 1994 Lab 94 - University of North Texas One O'Clock Lab Band (UNT Jazz)
- 1994 One O’Clock Standard Time: Remembering Gene Hall - University of North Texas One O'Clock Lab Band (UNT Jazz)

== Film, television, media ==
=== As instrumentalist ===
- 1989: Christmas Vacation (Warner Bros.)
- 2016: Avista: 2016 Way To Save - ad campaign

== Artists worked with (partial list) ==
- Randy Brecker
- Donald Brown
- Joyce Cobb
- Eliane Elias
- Johnny Frigo
- Frank Gambale
- Jon Hendricks
- Kamran Ince
- Kathy Kosins
- Phineas Newborn
- Della Reese
- Marvin Stamm
- Jimi Tunnell

== Discography (reviewed) ==
Year	Album	Primary artist producer conductor composer arranger instrumentalist	Type	Label	U.S.	Netherlands	U.K.	Poland	Review Rating
2010	The Chamber Wind Music of Jack Cooper	instrumentalist	Studio recording	Centaur					Fanfare Magazine very positive
2015	Time Within Itself	Primary artist producer composer instrumentalist	Studio recording	Origin Records	JazzWeek; April 13, 2015 #71		Jazz Journal	Multikulti Project	All About Jazz
2018	Origin Suite	Primary artist producer composer instrumentalist	Studio recording	Origin Records	JazzWeek; February 26, 2018 #67	Jazzenzo; Highly favorable	Jazz Journal		All About Jazz
2019	Triangularity	Primary artist producer composer instrumentalist	Studio recording	CD Baby	JazzWeek; January 27, 2020 #60				All About Jazz
