= Songs of Berlin =

Studio album by Berlin Jazz Orchestra feat. Marc Secara
- Released: October 17, 2021
- Recorded: November 22 & 23, 2018
- Studio: Studio Greve, Berlin, Germany
- Genre: Jazz
- Length: 50:05
- Label: GAM Records
- Producer: Marc Secara and Jack Cooper

Berlin Jazz Orchestra chronology
Strangers In Night - The Music Of Bert Kaempfert (2012)	Songs of Berlin (2021)
- GAM Records 921

Jack Cooper chronology
Origin Suite (2018)	Songs of Berlin (2021)

Songs of Berlin is an album by Marc Secara and the Berlin Jazz Orchestra, released digitally worldwide in October 2021 on GAM Records. The album features trombonist Jiggs Whigham and was arranged and conducted by Jack Cooper.

== Background ==
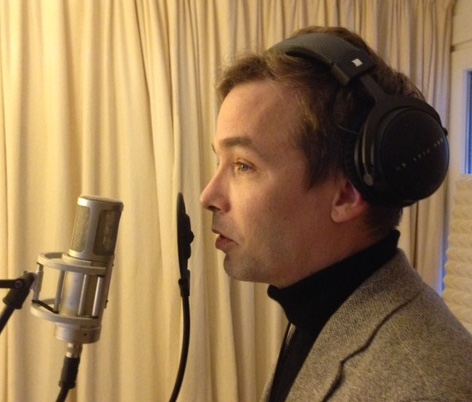
Marc Secara at Greve Studio, Berlin, Nov 2018

The album Songs of Berlin was first conceived of in late 2015 by Marc Secara, Jiggs Whigham and Jack Cooper after Cooper was appointed as a staff writer for the Berlin Jazz Orchestra in Spring (earlier in the year). Both Secara and Cooper proposed a themed album featuring Secara and Whigham that would have a wide appeal to both German and English-speaking music fans. The Berlin Jazz Orchestra also needed to have a new set of vocal arrangements as the last set of charts written for the band were for the 2008 You're Everything album written by British arranger Steve Gray.

A long list of proposed, Berlin-centered songs got whittled down to nine titles plus adding two original instrumentals by Whigham and Cooper. A balanced program of tunes was arrived at ranging from 1904 (Berliner Luft) all the way through an arrangement of David Bowie’s 2013 hit Where Are We Now?. Five of the list of arrangements were completed by December 2015 and premiered on January 27, 2016, in Berlin at the Kunstfabrik Schlot jazz club. The entire set of Cooper's charts for the album were completed by April 2015. A next set of the album works was performed in Berlin at the Wühlmäuse Theater on May 16.

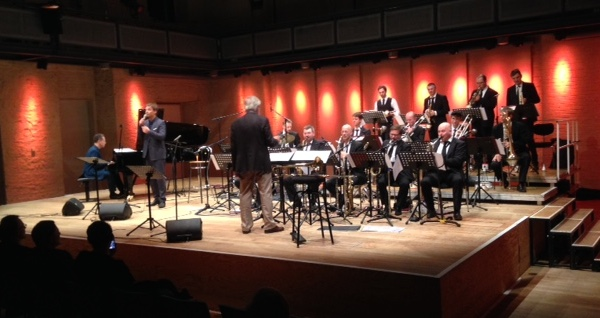
Berlin Jazz Orchestra, Rheinsberg, Nov 2018

Recording sessions for the Songs of Berlin album were eventually scheduled on November 22 and 23, 2018 at Greve Studio in Berlin-Zehlendorf. A ‘warm-up’, mini-tour of the album material before the recording session was presented at a concert on Schlosstheater Rheinsberg on November 18 to re-familiarize the Berlin Jazz Orchestra with the music.

== The individual works from Songs of Berlin ==
=== In Dieser Stadt ===
Singer Hildegard Knef co-wrote the original song with Charly Niessen to express her love of Berlin. Composed during the post-WWII era of the 1950s; "IN THIS CITY... MY CITY"... is Knef's anthem. Cooper, Secara and Whigam's updating of the song also renders an interpretation pointing at other cities such as New Orleans and Chicago.

=== Where Are We Now? ===
David Bowie’s 2013 song outlines the relationship between two people in the big, modern city of Berlin. The question is asked...’what do we do and where are we going...?’ ; a lost soul trying to find where they are with their beloved in Berlin. A tenor sax solo is given by Thomas Walter on the updating of Bowie's hit single.

=== Berliner Luft ===
Paul Lincke's song is the unofficial anthem of Berlin. ‘Luft’ is the beloved, traditional encore of the Berlin Philharmoniker orchestra. The piece originally comes from Lincke's 1899 operetta ‘Frau Luna’, about a trip to the moon in a hot air balloon. Secara's updating of the song is presented with a flugelhorn solo from Nik Neuser. the arrangement draws on musical influences of Barbra Streisand and Peter Matz to update Berliner Luft.

=== Haus Am See ===
The Peter Fox, 2008 mega-pop hit is arranged to feature Marc on a new, Cuban cha-cha-cha big band chart. A commentary of lives in contemporary Berlin and Germany. Jiggs Whigham is featuring on a trombone solo in the middle and end of the arrangement.

=== Gold Else ===
An original composition for the Berlin Jazz Orchestra inspired by the Die Gold Else ("Golden Lizzy") atop the Victory Column in the center of the Tiergarten in Berlin. A Johann Strauss inspired waltz with harmonic influences from Billy Strayhorn. Simon Harrer is featured, the primary focus on trombone; Secara is written into the work doing a vocalised doubling of the melody.

=== Berlin (Lou Reed) ===
Originally released in 1973, Lou Reed's song is the fictional fantasy, opening overture of the album/rock opera 'Berlin'. Two lovers in great turmoil, traveling to a divided Berlin; trying to salvage a relationship on the outs. The arrangement updates Reed's work, with the end of the couple's violent, passionate breakup. Both Schoen and Prinz take solos on the arrangement.

=== Berlin im Licht ===
In late 1928, Kurt Weill was commissioned to write a "theme song" for the first Berlin im Licht festival. Weill's lyric extolls the glories of Berlin im Licht (Berlin in Light). The arrangement is an up beat celebration of the city the band; Jiggs Whigham is featured.

=== Great Day For Freedom ===
Originally written in late 1989 shortly after the Berlin Wall fell, the Pink Floyd song is a timeless message. This is turned into a slow Gospel groove Secara sings and Nico Lohmann adds an alto sax statement.

=== For Someone Never Known ===
Second of the two instrumentals of the set, it emerges as a haunting anthem by Jiggs Whigham as both song writer and instrumentalist. Originally recorded for a small group in 1990, the new arrangement for jazz orchestra features Whigham on trombone.

=== Mackie Messer ===
‘Mackie’ is mordent and morose commentary, from Kurt Weill’s 1928 original work about post-industrial Berlin, "The Threepenny Opera." The Berlin Jazz Orchestra version is different, influenced by arrangers Bill Holman and Gerald Wilson. Patrick Braun's sax solo reminds the listener of muscular tenor players such as Arnett Cobb or Eddie ‘Lockjaw’ Davis.

=== Ich Hab Noch Einen Koffer in Berlin ===
Still, part of me is always in Berlin (I leave a suitcase there). Much like Tony Bennett’s anthem for San Francisco, both Marlene Dietrich and Hildegard Knef are known for singing this hit of their beloved Berlin, of de:Ralph Maria Siegel’s 1951 song. Simon Harrer adds trombone commentary to complete the arrangement.

== Promotion ==
The Songs of Berlin album has been primarily handled in Europe by GAM Records (Belgium/Germany). The album promotion in the United States has been handled by Kari-On productions out of Atlanta, Georgia; American record reviews have come through the firm in Atlanta. Invited, promotional interviews were done about the album; first with Deutschlandfunk Kultur on October 12, 2021, with Secara promoting the upcoming, November premier of the project. Secara also did an hour long feature about Songs of Berlin on Carsten Beyer's "Late Night Jazz" on January 22, 2022, for RBB Radio in Brandenburg, Germany.

== Critical reception and professional ratings ==
Professional ratings
Review scores
Source	Rating
5 Finger Review	91/100
All About Jazz	Very favorable
Jazz Sensibilities	Very favorable
jazz2love	Very favorable
JazzdaGama	Very favorable

Darnell Jackson of Five Finger Review gave great praise, "In its entirety, Songs of Berlin has different styles, languages, textures, tempos, and standout arrangements conveyed with warm textured singing and exciting playing and solos. This is an album emphasizing diversity and promises much for the astute listener."

C. Michael Bailey in All About Jazz frames the project, "Secara is in good voice, whether Deutsch or Englisch. No period piece, this: Songs of Berlin brims with "Now!".

== Track listing ==
All tracks are written by various composers, all selections adapted, arranged and orchestrated for jazz orchestra by Jack Cooper.

No.	Title	Writer(s)	Length
1.	"In Dieser Stadt"	Charly Niessen	4:15
2.	"Where Are We Now"	David Bowie	4:09
3.	"Berliner Luft"	Paul Lincke, Heinrich Bolten-Baeckers	4:10
4.	"Haus Am See"	Pierre Baigorry, David Conen, Ruth Maria Renner, Vincent von Schlippenbach	4:28
5.	"Goldelse"	Jack Cooper	4:06
6.	"Berlin"	Lou Reed	4:52
7.	"Berlin Im Licht"	Kurt Weill	2:56
8.	"A Great Day for Freedom"	David Gilmour, Polly Annie Samson	6:02
9.	"For Someone Never Known"	Jiggs Whigham	6:39
10.	"Mackie Messer"	Kurt Weill, Bertolt Brecht	3:14
11.	"Ich Hab Noch Einen Koffer In Berlin"	Rudolph Maria Siegel, Aldo von Pinelli	4:56

== Personnel ==
- Marc Secara – vocals
- Jiggs Whigham – trombone
- Jeanfrançois Prins – guitar
- Wolfgang Koehler – piano
- Andreas Henze – bass
- Ralph Graessler – bass
- Tobias Backhaus – drums
- Michael Waldrop; – vibraphone and auxiliary percussion
- Benny Brown – trumpet
- Martin Gerwig – trumpet
- Jürgen Hahn – trumpet
- Nikolaus Neuser – trumpet
- Christoph Hermann – trombone
- Simon Harrer – trombone
- Jan Landowski – trombone
- Arne Fischer – bass trombone
- Jonas Schoen– alto sax, flute and bass clarinet
- Nico Lohmann – alto sax, flute and clarinet
- Patrick Braun – tenor saxophone and clarinet
- Thomas Walter Maria – tenor sax, flute and clarinet
- Nik Leistle – baritone saxophone and bass clarinet
- Maxime Shakir (4), Sarah Kaiser (8), Elisabeth Schmidt (8) – backing vocals

Production notes:

- Marc Secara – producer
- Jack Cooper – producer, arranger, conductor
- Nico Raschke – engineer

== Recording Sessions and production ==
- November 22 & 23, 2018 (17 piece ensemble)

Sessions contracted by Philipp Schoof for Viviendo Music. Recorded by Nico Raschke at Greve Studio in Berlin-Zehlendorf, Germany.

- Jan – July 2019 (extra recording, solos, vocals)

– Extra recording, solos, vocals in various locations Berlin, Germany.

– Vibraphone and Percussion recorded by Wentao Xing at EWU Studio Editing

- Editing, Mixdown and Mastering

– Nico Raschke at Hansahaus Studio, Bonn, Germany

== See also ==
- Berlin Jazz Orchestra
- Marc Secara
- Jiggs Whigham
- Jack Cooper
- List of jazz arrangers
