= Time Within Itself =

Studio album by Michael Waldrop
- Released: 17 March 2015
- Recorded: 11 July 2014
- Studios: Crystal Clear Sound, Dallas, Texas
- Genres: Jazz; big band; jazz fusion; instrumental
- Label: Origin - 82690
- Producers: John Bishop (exec. prod.); Michael Waldrop (prod.)

Michael Waldrop chronology
| Triangularity (2005) | Time Within Itself (2015) | Origin Suite (2018) |

Jack Cooper chronology
| Mists: Charles Ives for Jazz Orchestra (2014) | Time Within Itself (2015) | Origin Suite (2018) |

Time Within Itself is a big band jazz album released by Origin Records on March 17, 2015. The concept for the recording came from the idea of a high level feature CD showcasing the Michael Waldrop Big Band. Music critic Jack Bowers gave the recording 4 and a half of 5 stars and noted, "Waldrop's first visit to a recording studio with his own big band was worth the wait".

== Background ==
Early in 2013 Michael Waldrop forwarded a portfolio of songs (jazz instrumentals) to Jack Cooper in order to commission big band arrangements. After Cooper arrived back from a trip to England in the Summer or 2013 he was finally able to assess the tunes and make some decisions. Because of the high quality of Waldrop's compositions it was suggested he try to pursue a whole commercial CD that would feature Waldrop. A substantial grant ($10,000) was obtained by Waldrop from Eastern Washington University to do a CD.

Both a commercial big band CD and a 'Music Minus One' (for students drummers) types of projects were pursued. Due to the complexity of having both types of recordings and the many cost prohibitive factors involved, the decision was made to recorded during the Summer of 2014 in Dallas, Texas. The studio used was Crystal Clear Sound located in the northern part of the city. Soon after that recording session on July 11, 2014, John Bishop at Origin Records was approached about carrying the CD as a commercial recording (two other labels were in the running for this). The level of artists used on the recording was very high: many of these musicians are both established recording artists and full-time college educators.

== Track listing ==
All tracks are written by Michael Waldrop and Jack Cooper.

| No. | Title | Length |
|---|---|---|
| 1. | "El Vino" | 8:24 |
| 2. | "Tunnell Vision" | 6:42 |
| 3. | "Time Within Itself" | 7:03 |
| 4. | "Munich Musings" | 7:36 |
| 5. | "Inner Truth" | 6:55 |
| 6. | "Vistas" | 5:26 |
| 7. | "Her Moon Rises East" | 6:31 |
| 8. | "Twisted Barb" | 5:03 |

== Recording ==
- July 11, 2014

Recorded at Crystal Clear Sound, Dallas, Texas.

== Personnel ==
=== Musicians ===
- Conductor, arranger, composer: Jack Cooper
- Alto Saxophone/flute/clarinet/soprano sax: Will Campbell
- Alto Saxophone/flute/clarinet: Tim Ishii
- Tenor Saxophone/flute/clarinet/soprano sax: Larry Panella
- Tenor Saxophone/clarinet: Chris McGuire
- Baritone Saxophone/bass clarinet: Paul Baker
- Trumpet and flugelhorn: Keith Jourdan (lead), David Spencer, Larry Spencer, Mike Steinel
- Trombone: Anthony Williams (lead), Tony Baker, Greg Waits, John Wasson (bass)
- Guitar: Chris DeRose
- Piano: Steve Snyder
- Bass: Carl Hillman
- Drums and Vibraphone: Mike Waldrop
- Guitar/Vocal : Jimi Tunnell (guitar on tracks 2,6,7 vocals on track 2)
- Guitar: Chad McLoughlin (guitar on track 3)
- Vocal: Sandra Dudley (on tracks 6 & 7)
- Percussion: José Rossy (on tracks 2,4,5,6,7)

=== Production ===
- Executive Producer: John Bishop
- Producer: Michael Waldrop
- Associate Producers: Jimi Tunnell, Jack Cooper, Tim Reppert
- Recording engineer: Kent Stump at Crystal Clear Sound, July 11, 2014
- Recording engineer (additional and overdubs): Jimi Tunnell
- Editing and mix engineer: Tim Reppert at Soundtrack Studios, Boston and REP Studio, Ithaca, NY.
- Mastering: Robert Vosgien at Capitol Records, Los Angeles
- Liner notes: Bill Milkowski
- Cover design and layout: John Bishop
- Cover Painting: Laurin Rinder
- Liner photographs: Daniel Pardo and Ivana Ćojbašić
- Jimi Tunnell vocal and guitar was recorded at Buffalo Sound in Denton, Texas, August 2014
- Vibraphone was recorded at Michael Lewis Music in Spokane WA, July 18, 2014
- Sandra Dudley was recorded in Nashville, Tennessee, August 8, 2014 by Brendan Harkin at Wildwood Recording.

== Promotion ==
The 'Time Within Itself' CD was premiered in Memphis, Tennessee, on March 7, 2015, by the Jazz Orchestra of the Delta as part of the University of Memphis Jazz Week performances. The album had its Northwest U.S. premiere on July 27, 2015, at Tula's Jazz Club in Seattle, Washington with the Northwest version of the Michael Waldrop Big Band. Waldrop and his big band were invited to perform the album at the Jazz Education Network International Conference in Louisville, Kentucky on January 9, 2016. The original ensemble from the recording performed; included were guest artists Brad Dutz and Billy Hulting. The music from the Time Within Itself CD has acquired significant international recognition to include other groups playing the music. The Swingin' Paradise Jazz Orchestra in Tokyo, Japan performed Tunnell Vision on July 18, 2016, at Musasino Big Band Jazz Festival.

Advertisements were run in both Down Beat Magazine and JazzTimes in the March issues (2015) for Origin Records to feature the CD. Drumhead Magazine published a two part feature of transcribed solos and drums parts from the 'Time Within Itself' CD starting with the June 2015 (#50) edition. Origin Records submitted the TWI CD into the first round ballot of the 58th Annual Grammy Awards for the categories of Best Arrangement Instrumental or a Cappella, Best Large Jazz Ensemble Album, and Best Instrumental Composition. Most recently the entire album was featured on Scott Ellsworth's long running Scott's Place jazz radio show for February 2, 2019.

== Reception ==
Professional ratings
Review scores
| Source | Rating |
|---|---|
| All About Jazz (3) | Notable of 2015 #1 of top 12 "Most Recommended" reviews of 2015 |
| ART ON MY SLEEVE | Jazz: The Best CDs of 2015 |
| Down Beat | 3/5 stars |
| Improvijazzation; Nation | 4.98/5 stars |
| International Association of Jazz Record Collectors; IAJRC Journal | Highly favorable |
| Jazz Journal | 4/5 stars |
| The Jazz Reader | 4.3/5 stars |
| Jazz Scan | Highly favorable |
| Jazz Weekly | Highly favorable |
| Midwest Record | Highly favorable |
| Multikulti Project | 4.5/5 stars |
| O's Place Jazz Newsletter | 4/5 stars |
| Percussive Notes; PAS Journal | Highly favorable |
| Tom Hull; Best Jazz Albums of 2015 | B |
| WRTI 90.1; Philadelphia | Best of 2015; Big Band Jazz Releases |
| WRTI 90.1; Philadelphia | Top 100; Jazz Countdown #67 |

'"Time Within Itself" is the rare large ensemble recording that builds upon tradition but never sounds retro. Smart, carefully plotted arrangements, crisp, thoughtful solos, surprises at every turn and a consistently solid groove result in a big band set for people who never thought they'd like big band music.'

Jeff Tamarkin, Associate Editor, JazzTimes magazine

'"Time Within Itself" is a state-of-the-art modern large jazz ensemble project that I highly recommend. Made up of some of my favorite people in the Dallas Fort Worth area as well as some imports, this band is magnificent. Standouts to me were Mike's wonderful drums and the thrilling guitar of Jimi Tunnell. When you add Sandra's (Dudley) voice to the mix, you get a great 21st Century texture that lifts this project up into the contemporary sizzle zone! I really enjoyed the masterful orchestrations and developmental writing of Jack Cooper. He has really developed a musical palette that can tell a story in a very evocative manner. Great stuff one-and-all!'

Steve Wiest, multiple Grammy-nominated, multi-genre artist.

"Impeccable performance, great charts, a fresh new sound. Bravo!"

Chris Walden, 6 time Grammy nominated composer/arranger, for film, T.V. and numerous recording artists

"It is always refreshing to hear new original big band music. Michael Waldrop and Jack Cooper have struck a great balance on their new album from Origin Records; 'Time With Itself.' Nothing drives a band better than a drummer playing his own music; there is a special groove that comes out that feels just right. However, without great arrangements the music might turn into one long, funky drum solo; that is for sure not the case here. Cooper's colorful and inventive arrangements bring all the tunes to life, showcasing his style while bringing the out the best in Waldrop's tunes."

Tim Davies, Grammy-nominated composer, orchestrator, and drummer.

== Charts ==
| Year | Chart | Type | Song/Album | Peak Position | Chart Date |
|---|---|---|---|---|---|
| 2015 | JazzWeek Airplay Reporting | Album | Time Within Itself | 71 | April 20, 2015 |

== Release history ==
| Region | Date | Label | Format |
|---|---|---|---|
| Canada | March 17, 2015 | Origin Records | CD, digital download |
| United Kingdom | March 17, 2015 | Origin Records | CD, digital download |
| Japan | March 17, 2015 | Origin Records | CD, digital download |
| United States | March 17, 2015 | Origin Records | CD, digital download |
| Europe (Germany) | March 20, 2015 | Origin Records | CD, digital download |

== See also ==
- Origin Records
- Jack Cooper
- List of jazz arrangers
