= Sound of Home =

Studio album by Young Voices Brandenburg
- Released: 5 June 2016
- Recorded: 17 – 21 February 2016
- Studio: Greve Studio, Berlin
- Genre: choir; pop; vocal; jazz
- Length: 1:01:51
- Label: Junge Töne
- Producer: Marc Secara

Young Voices Brandenburg chronology
1000 Jahre (2013)	Sound of Home (2016)
- cat. #29767, Junge Töne

Sound of Home is the sixth studio album from the Young Voices Brandenburg on the Junge Töne label. The concept for the CD focuses on popular repertoire relating the questions "Where I come from, where I belong and where I feel at home".

== Background ==
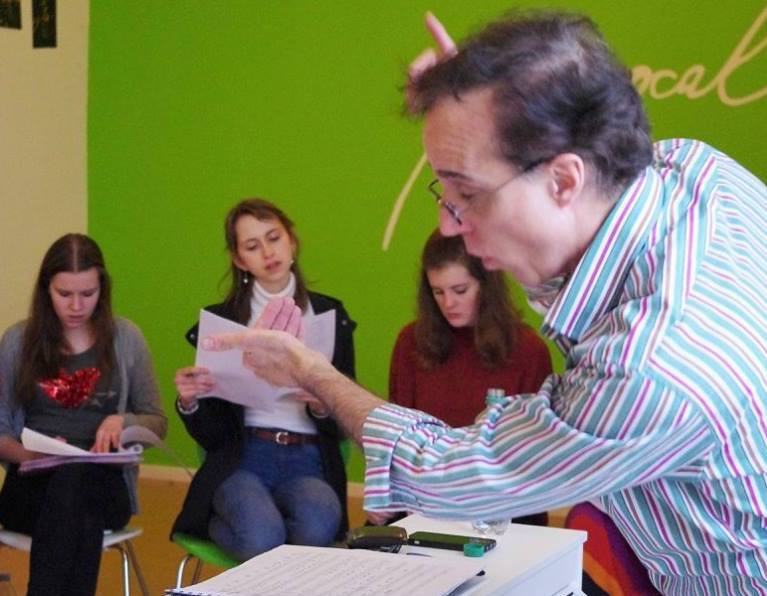
Jack Cooper preparing for Sound of Home recording sessions with Young Voices of Brandenburg, February 2016

The concept of the Sound of Home CD came from director Marc Secara in asking the questions "Where I come from, where I belong and where I feel at home". The repertoire chosen for the album was closely coordinated with 7 arrangers Secara trusted to write cover versions of hit tunes dating back to Antônio Carlos Jobims 1959 composition Chega de Saudade and the tradition Germany folksong Schlaflied. The program for the CD comes all the way forward to songs made popular by more recently artists such as Michael Bublé, Johannes Oerding, and Melody Gardot. Original material from within the ensemble is also included on the release.

== Track listing ==
All tracks are written by noted

No.	Title	Writer(s)	arranger	Length
1.	"Heimat"	Johannes Oerding	Tanja Pannier	4:24
2.	"True Colors"	Cyndi Lauper	Friedemann Matzeit	4:07
3.	"Wide Open Spaces"	Susan Gibson	Nicolai Thärichen	4:10
4.	"Dann bin ich zu Haus"	Gregor Meyle	Juan Garcia	4:08
5.	"Fields of Gold"	Sting	Juan Garcia	6:08
6.	"Oft gefragt"	AnnenMayKantereit	Winnie Brückner	4:30
7.	"Home"	Bublé/Chang/Foster-Gillies	Friedemann Matzeit	3:50
8.	"Place We Belong"	Will Czuch	Nicolai Thärichen	4:28
9.	"Chega de Saudade - No More Blue's"	Antônio Carlos Jobim	Jack Cooper	2:47
10.	"Goodnite"	Melody Gardot	Winnie Brückner	4:25
11.	"She's Leaving Home"	Lennon–McCartney	Jack Cooper	3:53
12.	"Horizantläufer"	Marius Berg	Nicolai Thärichen	4:50
13.	"Grandma's Hands"	Bill Withers	Matthias Knoche	5:15
14.	"Schaflied"	Volkslied, anon.	Stefan Intemann	4:56

== Recording sessions ==
- February 17–21, 2016 - Greve Studio, Berlin, Germany

== Personnel ==
=== Musicians ===
- Conductor: Marc Secara
- Soprano I (female voice): Amelie Schreiber, Josephine Lichel, Karoline Weidt, Sara Spellerberg, Laura Fellhauer
- Soprano II (female voice): Elisabeth Hannah, Laura Fellhauer, Mirijam Olbrich, Susann Schüler
- Alto I (female voice): Viktoria Anton, Julenka Werkmeister, Nina Berck, Tina May, Charlotte Haselon
- Alto II (female voice): Domii R Rose, Mai Linh, Lucy Castle, Josephine Lichel, Susann Students
- Tenor (male voice): Marius Berg, Mico Wuppermann, Sebastian Sanchez, René Großerüschkamp
- Bass (male voice): Niklas Lukassen, Willy Tschusch, Stefan Intemann
- Harmonica: Harry Ermer
- Guitar: James Scholfield
- Piano/keyboards: Nicolai Thärichen
- Bass: Niklas Lukassen
- Drums/Congas/Percussion: Kai Schoenburg

=== Production ===
- Producer, conductor, editor-engineer: Marc Secara
- Editing: Metropolitan Music Studio, Berlin
- Producer, engineer: Silvio Naumann
- Assistant-producer/English language consultant: Jack Cooper
- Digital mastering: Silvio Naumann
- Production assistant: Steffi Garke
- Liner Notes: Marc Secara
- Cover art and design: Stefan Matzdorf

== Promotion ==
Performance and premiere of the Sound of Home, June 5, 2016 in Berlin Germany at the Heimathafen Neukölln Theatre. A special feature with RBB Kulturradio was broadcast on Saturday, June 4 at 7:10 a.m ("Das Porträt" program) about the "Sound of Home" CD and the release. A tour of the state of Brandenburg was used to promote and the CD through the Summer of 2016; first touring July 30 through August 11. The tour for Sound of Home is featured on a RBB television special (was first aired on September 22, 2016).

== Release history ==
Region	Date	Label	Format
Europe (Germany)	June 1, 2016	Junge Tone	CD

== See also ==
- Deutscher Musikrat
- Jack Cooper
- Marc Secara
- Young Voices Brandenburg
