= Young Voices Brandenburg =

- Choir
- Origin: Potsdam, Germany
- Founded: 2000
- Genre: Mixed vocal jazz choir
- Members: 20-25
- Chief conductor: Marc Secara (2000-2019) Daniel Barke (2020-present)
- Website: www.youngvoicesbrandenburg.de

The Young Voices Brandenburg are a popular music choir of over 20 individually microphoned voices, composed of 14 to 18-year-old male and female singers. The musical ensemble is specifically auditioned from the State of Brandenburg, Germany on a two-year rotation. They have toured the United States, China, and South Africa as well as having recorded numerous CDs.

The ensemble has been conducted by jazz and pop singer/educator Marc Secara since its beginnings in 2000 until the year 2019; he was replaced in 2020 by Daniel Barke. The ensemble was initiated in 2000; their first CD release was that same year.

== Awards and achievements ==
On March 10, 2017, the Young Voices Brandenburg were awarded the Sonderpreis für Zivilcourage und Gemeinsinn by the Tourismus-Marketing Brandenburg. This was the sixth time prize was awarded for "civil courage and mutualism." The prize is awarded to people and institutions of Brandenburg who are accomplishing special projects for the enrichment of Brandenburg and German society. Their tour of the State of Brandenburg during the summer of 2016 was catalyst for the award.

== Discography/DVD ==
- 2003 SING! (Junge Töne)
- 2006 OBERHAMMERGAU (Playground Records)
- 2009 VERTONT (Junge Töne)
- 2011 ECHOES OF MOTOWN (Playground Records)
- 2013 1000 (Junge Töne)
- 2016 SOUND OF HOME (Junge Töne)
- 2018 SOUL JOURNEY (Mons)
- 2019 YOUNG VOICES MATTER (Junge Töne)

== See also ==
- Verband der Musik- und Kunstschulen Brandenburg
- Deutscher Musikrat
- Marc Secara
- Jiggs Whigham
