= Mario Cruz =

American musician

Mario Cruz is a New York City-area saxophone player with a number of credits to his name. He is perhaps best known for playing on Bruce Springsteen's 1988 Tunnel of Love Express tour.

He also played with Willy DeVille on various Europe tours. He can be heard on DeVille's Willy DeVille Live album. Cruz is featured on the 2018 release Origin Suite with the Michael Waldrop Big Band.

He also played in Jaco Pastorius's 'Word of Mouth' band.
