= Marc Secara =

German singer and recording artist (born 1976)

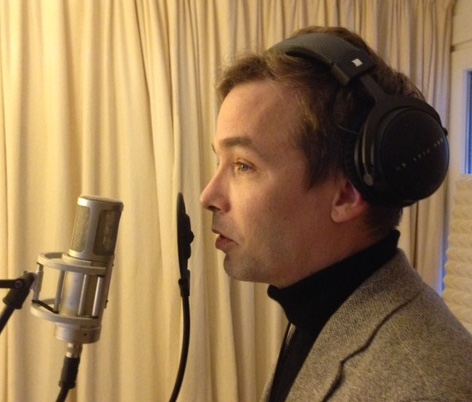
- Marc Secara at Greve Studio, Berlin

Background information
- Born: 20 February 1976 (age 50); Bad Harzburg, West Germany
- Genres: Swing; traditional pop; big band; jazz-funk
- Occupations: Singer; educator; television
- Instruments: Vocals; keyboards; saxophone
- Years active: 1995–present
- Labels: Polydor/Universal; RBB Kulturradio
- Website: marcsecara.de

Marc Secara (born 20 February 1976) is a German singer and recording artist known for jazz, American pop music, and German popular repertoire. He is also a member of the German singing group the Berlin Voices.

== Early life ==
Marc Secara was born in Bad Harzburg (Niedersachsen) and raised in Bavaria. At the age of 15 while in school at the gymnasium he founded his own band. After school and civil service he studied music (saxophone) at the Hochschule für Musik Nürnberg. He first met Peter Herbolzheimer at that school who would become a big influence on Secara's development as an artist. Secara's interests gravitated more towards voice performance and at the age of 20 he moved to Berlin and attended Hochschule für Musik "Hanns Eisler" studying voice, jazz, and popular music. In 2000 he received an IASJ scholarship and a period of study at the Berklee College of Music in Boston (USA). From 1997 to 1999 he was a soloist and member of the jazz choir vocal group member for the National Youth Jazz Orchestra (Bujazzo) under the direction of Peter Herbolzheimer.

== Professional career ==
In 1998 Marc Secara founded the Berlin Voices, a four-part vocal group much like Manhattan Transfer with two female and two male voices. The group released two critically acclaimed CDs: The Music of Billy Joel, and About Christmas. The group has also toured and recorded with the HR Big Band (Frankfurt) and the Berlin Jazz Orchestra.

In 2001 his "Marc Secara Group" was the first Western Jazz band which had a tour in the Islamic Republic of Iran. After another Iranian tour in 2002, he won with his Marc Secara Group 1st prize as "Best Artist" of the nationwide music festival "Fader". In 2004 Secara toured Europe as a "cultural ambassador" of the Federal Republic of Germany and performed four concerts for the former Federal President Johannes Rau and Horst Köhler. In 2006 he sang in duet with baritone Thomas Quasthoff at the Federal President's Summer Party. In 2006 he was also a solo artist on tour in Germany with the HR Big Band, strings and a choir; Secara was one of the youngest guest soloists to appear with the Hessian Radio Jazz Orchestra. This was part of the Bert Kaempfert (Germany) tour nationwide, the first major one in 20 years.

In 2008 Secara recorded and toured with actor and singer Manfred Krug. In 2009 he composed Killing Is My Business, Honey with Hoku Ho and Rick Kavanian for the movie Mord ist mein Geschäft, Liebling. With Berlin Jazz Orchestra he sang the theme song for the movie.

In 2009 Marc Secara entered a production contract with Bert Kaempfert Music Publishing. Together with a German all star jazz orchestra, he recorded a CD with Bert Kaempfert's music. In 2010 was the presentation of the new stage show Now and Forever, featuring the music from the CD.

Secara is featured on the 2018 release Origin Suite as a collaboration with composer Jack Cooper; he supplies prominent vocalese parts on four of the twelve tracks for the album.

=== Berlin Jazz Orchestra ===
Since 2000 Secara has been working with his own big band, the Berlin Jazz Orchestra. The ensemble is under the direction of former RIAS Big Band conductor Jiggs Whigham. In collaboration with the music agent Jacky Wagner and Rundfunk Berlin-Brandenburg (RBB) their first CDs were released in 2004 and 2008; the albums Update and You're Everything with scores commissioned from the British arranger Steve Gray.

2005 celebrated the Berlin Jazz Orchestra's 5th Anniversary as part of a broadcasting Germany, moderated by Alfred Biolek.

In 2009 Secara and the Berlin Jazz Orchestra toured Estonia, Azerbaijan and performed in numerous concert halls in Germany.

In 2012 the concert video Strangers In Night - The Music Of Bert Kaempfert was produced with the Berlin Jazz Orchestra with Secara's repertoire completed for the earlier recording from 2010. In November 2014 the group toured Germany with the New York Voices. In 2014 Secara hired arranger and conductor Jack Cooper to collaborate on the new Songs of Berlin BJO project and CD recording. Secara's Songs of Berlin project includes noted hit tunes of German artists such as Marlene Dietrich, Hildegard Knef, and Peter Fox.

== Education and teaching ==
Since 2008, he is a vocal coach of the National Youth Jazz Orchestra (BuJazzO), the Landesjugendjazzorchester Brandenburg and the State Youth Jazz Orchestra Berlin. Until 2019 he was the musical director for the Young Voices Brandenburg. In 2013 he was appointed professor of singing and ensemble at the SRH Hochschule der populären Künste (Berlin).

Marc Secara resides in Berlin, Germany.

== Discography ==
=== Albums/DVD ===
- 1997 Faces – Out of Mind (Soloist)
- 1998 Gerling – (BuJazzO) Soloist
- 1999 On Tour – (BuJazzO) Soloist und Vokalgruppe
- 1999 Swinging & Singing (BuJazzO) (Casino Lights) Soloist
- 2002 Weihnachts-Krug – Manfred Krug (Warner Bros.) Sideman
- 2004 Update (44 Records) Soloist/Producer
- 2006 Strangers in the Night – the Music of Bert Kaempfert (Polydor/Universal) Soloist
- 2007 States of Mind – Berlin Voices (Van Dyck Records) Soloist
- 2008 You're Everything (RBB Kulturradio) Soloist/Producer
- 2009 Mord ist mein Geschäft, Liebling (Warner Bros.) Soundtrack/Soloist
- 2010 About Christmas – Berlin Voices (Hänssler Classic) Soloist
- 2011 Now and Forever – Secara meets Kaempfert (Silver Spot Records) Soloist
- 2012 Strangers In Night - The Music Of Bert Kaempfert – DVD (Polydor/Universal)- Soloist
- 2016 Olympics – Games of Passion – (Phina Music) Soloist
- 2018 Origin Suite (Origin) featured with the Michael Waldrop Big Band
- 2018 A Soul Journey (Mons) as musical director
- 2018 Fruit of Passion (Jazz Sick Records) featured with Ro Gebhardt
- 2018 Me and My World (Acte Préalable) featured with Katarzyna Dondalska
- 2020 Today & Yesterday: The Bert Kaempfert Anthology (Polydor)
- 2021 Songs of Berlin (GAM Music)
- 2022 Crosscurrent (Schoener Horen Music)

=== Singles ===
- 1997: Faces – Out of Mind (Soloist)
- 2009: Mord ist mein Geschäft, Liebling (Soundtrack/Soloist)
