= Judy Niemack =

American jazz vocalist (born 1954)

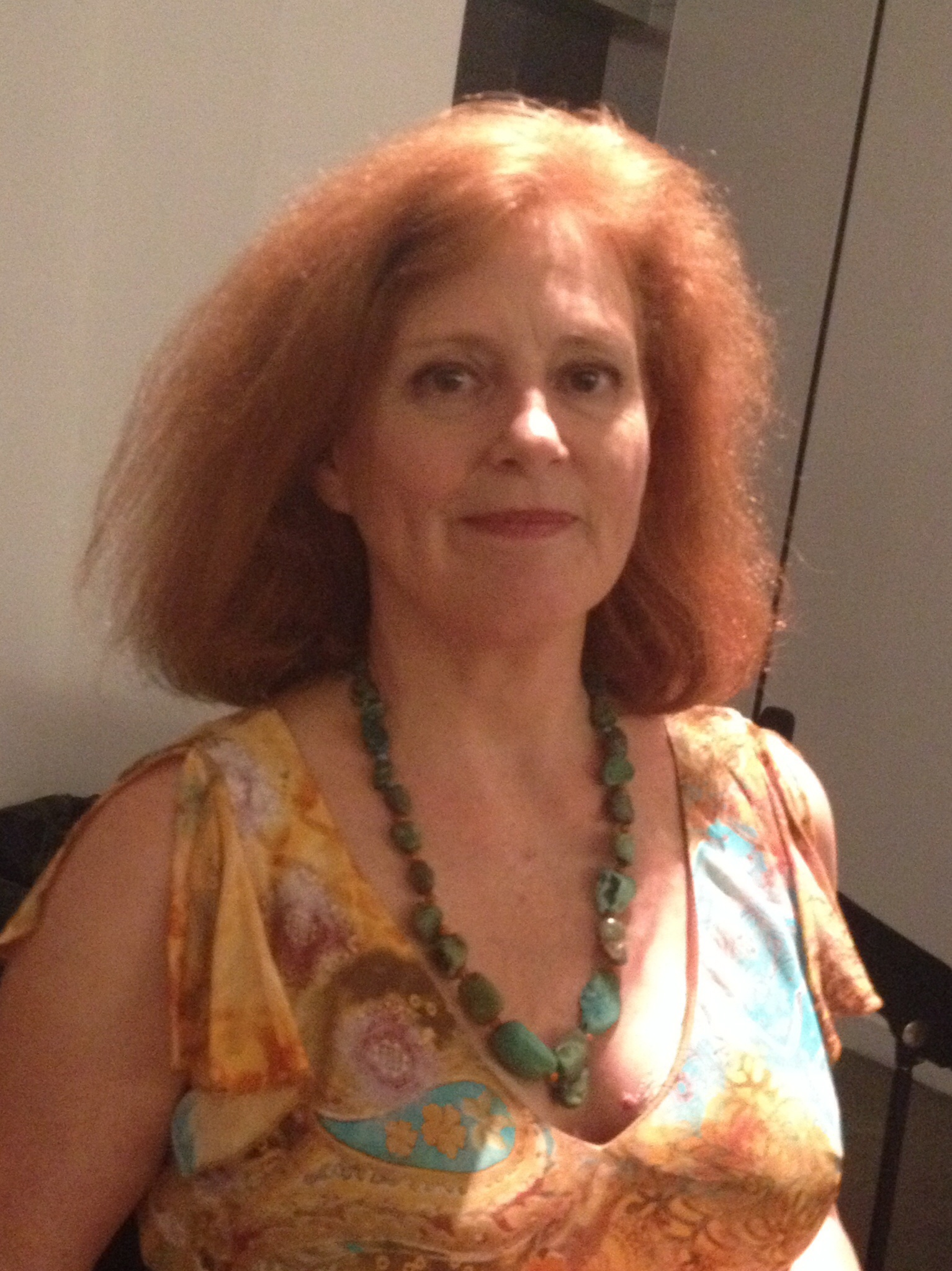

Background information
- Born: March 11, 1954 (age 72); Pasadena, California, U.S.
- Genres: Jazz, vocal jazz
- Occupation: Singer
- Years active: 1978–present
- Labels: Sea Breeze, Freelance, Stash, Blujazz
- Website: judyniemack.com

Judy Niemack (born March 11, 1954) is an American jazz vocalist.

== Early life ==
Judy Niemack was born in Pasadena, California to a musical family. She began singing in a church choir from the age of seven. Niemack decided on a professional career in singing at age 17 and studied Bel canto singing with Primo Lino Puccinelli in Pasadena for 3 years. She studied classical voice and jazz improvisation with Gary Foster at Pasadena City College, and later attended the New England Conservatory of Music and the Cleveland Institute of Music. After pursuing classical studies until 1975, she returned to California to study jazz improvisation with Marsh (who she had met early on). Niemack eventually moved to New York City in 1977, her first major engagement was a week at the Village Vanguard, singing in Warne Marsh's band.

== Professional career ==
Her debut album, By Heart was recorded in New York City and released in 1977; since then she has recorded 12 albums under her own name in addition to working with Toots Thielemans, James Moody, Lee Konitz, Clark Terry, Kenny Barron, Fred Hersch, Kenny Werner, Joe Lovano, Eddie Gómez and the WDR Big Band (among others).

In 1987, while living in New York, Niemack met guitarist Jeanfrançois Prins; the two would eventually marry in 1998. In 1992 Niemack relocated to Brussels and taught vocal jazz in the Royal Conservatory of Brussels, the Royal Conservatory of Antwerp, and the Royal Conservatory of the Hague. The couple recorded several CDs together and performed together extensively. In 1995 the couple moved to Berlin, where she became the first Professor of Jazz Voice in Germany, teaching at the Hochschule für Musik "Hanns Eisler" (later called Jazz Institut Berlin) and also establishing the vocal jazz program at Musikene, the Basque School of Higher Music, in San Sebastian, Spain (2003-2015). The couple eventually divorced in 2016.

== Teaching ==
Niemack has written and published a set of three widely praised method books on jazz singing; the Hear It and Sing It! series. Since 1995, she has been a professor of vocal jazz studies at the JIB (Jazz Institute Berlin). Prominent vocal students of Niemack's include artists such as Dominique Lacasa, Marc Secara, Efrat Alony, Lucia Cadotsch and Erik Leuthäuser. Niemack has written lyrics for over 100 compositions by Thelonious Monk, Bill Evans, Richie Beirach, Pat Metheny and Kenny Dorham (among others) which have been recorded on numerous albums.

== Personal ==
Niemack currently lives in both Berlin and New York City.

== Discography ==
- By Heart with Simon Wettenhall (Sea Breeze, 1978)
- Blue Bop with Cedar Walton (Free Lance, 1989)
- Long As You're Living (Free Lance, 1990)
- Heart's Desire with Kenny Barron (Stash, 1992)
- Beauty and the Prince with Jeanfrançois Prins (AMC, 1993)
- Straight Up (Free Lance, 1993)
- Mingus, Monk & Mal with Mal Waldron (Free Lance, 1995)
- Night and the Music (Free Lance, 1997)
- About Time (Sony, 2002)
- Jazz Singer's Practice Session (GAM, 2004)
- What's Goin' On? (Temps, 2005)
- Blue Nights (Blujazz, 2007)
- In the Sundance (Blujazz, 2009)
- Listening to You with Dan Tepfer (Sunnyside, 2017) – recorded in 2012
- New York Stories with Jim McNeely, DR Big Band (Sunnyside, 2018)
- Sing Your Song with Wolfgang Koehler (Contemplate Music, 2019)
- What's Love with Peter Bernstein (guitarist), Sullivan Fortner, Doug Weiss, Joe Farnsworth + guest Eric Alexander (jazz saxophonist) (Sunnyside, 2022)
- Voices in Flight with Jay Clayton (musician), Jeanfrançois Prins, Jay Anderson, and John di Martino (GAM, 2023)
