= Spirit of Mingus =

Live album by Steve Lacy and Eric Watson
- Released: 1992
- Recorded: December 5–7, 1991
- Venue: Passage du Nord-Ouest, Paris, France
- Genre: Jazz
- Length: 63:30
- Label: Free Lance; FRL-CD 016
- Producer: Jean-Paul Rodrigue

Steve Lacy chronology
Live at Sweet Basil (1992)	Spirit of Mingus (1992)	Clangs (1993)

Spirit of Mingus is a live album by soprano saxophonist Steve Lacy and pianist Eric Watson, recorded in Paris in 1991 and first released on the Free Lance label in 1992.

== Reception ==
Professional ratings
Review scores
Source	Rating
AllMusic	4/5 stars
The Penguin Guide to Jazz Recordings	3/4 stars

The AllMusic review by Ken Dryden stated, "pianist Eric Watson is a more-than-capable foil for Lacy's adventurous excursions into the works of Charles Mingus ... fans of Steve Lacy are advised to pick up this outstanding release quickly".

== Track listing ==
All compositions by Charles Mingus

1. "Peggy's Blue Skylight" – 6:47
2. "Self Portrait in Three Colors" – 8:48
3. "Nostalgia in Times Square" – 5:25
4. "I X Love" – 7:53
5. "Reincarnation of a Lovebird" – 9:12
6. "Pithycanthropus Erectus" – 6:41
7. "Free Cell, Block F..." – 7:03
8. "Goodbye Pork Pie Hat" – 5:23
9. "Remember Rockefeller at Attica" – 6:18

== Personnel ==
- Steve Lacy – soprano saxophone
- Eric Watson – piano
