= Melanie Cries Alone =

Song by Consortium
- A-side: "Melanie Cries Alone"
- B-side: "Copper Coloured Years"
- Released: 1970
- Label: Trend TNT 52
- Composers: Myers, Worsley, Robinson
- Producer: John Worsley

UK chronology
"I Don't Want Her Anymore" (1969)	"Melanie Cries Alone" (1970)	"Annabella" (1971)

"Melanie Cries Alone" was a single for English psychedelic pop group Consortium. It was released in the UK in 1970 but became a hit a year later in another country.

== Background ==
"Melanie Cries Alone" was composed by Myers, Worsley and Robinson. It was produced by John Worsley and arranged by Steve Grey.

In the week of 31 January 1970, Cashbox reported that Trend Records had put together a sampler record with excerpts by three artists, The Chads with "Dearest Belinda", Consortium with "Melanie Cries Alone", and Abel Mann with "The Sun in My Morning". Each section was announced by DJ David Hamilton. The Consortium song was released that month. Backed with "Copper Coloured Years" it was released on Trend TNT 52 in January, 1970. It was distributed by Pye.

It appears on the various artists compilation, Looking Back: The Pye Anthology that was released in 2003.

== Chart ==
"Melanie Cries Alone" made its debut at no. 18 in Portugal's Top 20 TMP chart in the week of 12 September 1971. It spent another week in the chart, reaching no. 13.
