= Members Only (band) =

Members Only was an American jazz-funk project, under the guidance of Chris Hills, and featuring Nelson Rangell on saxophone, flute and piccolo; Michael Brecker on tenor saxophone; Lew Soloff on trumpet; Andy Marvel on keyboards; Chris Hills on drums, keyboards, guitar and vocals; Jimi Tunnell and Billy Masters on guitar; Haim Cotton on piano; Yossi Fine on bass guitar; and Bashiri Johnson on percussion.

They released two albums on Muse Records.
