= Update (Berlin Jazz Orchestra album) =

Studio album by Marc Secara Jiggs Whigham Berlin Jazz Orchestra
- Released: 2004
- Recorded: 2003/2004; Berlin, Germany
- Genre: Jazz, Big band, instrumental
- Length: 55:59
- Label: 44 Records, LC 12576
- Producer: Jacky Wagner (exec. prod.); Marc Secara (prod.); Jiggs Whigham (prod.)

Berlin Jazz Orchestra chronology
Update (2004)	You're Everything (2007)

Marc Secara chronology
Weihnachts-Krug (2002)	Update (2004)	States of Mind (2007)

Update is a jazz album produced by 44 Records and producer Jacky Wagner, released in 2004. The album was critically acclaimed by Jazz Podium magazine as the first initial recording for the Berlin Jazz Orchestra with vocal artist Marc Secara. Jazz artist Jiggs Whigham is featured on this release as both instrumentalist (trombone) and musical director and Steve Gray's arrangements are featured on this recording.

== Background ==
After being founded in 2000, the Berlin Jazz Orchestra had their first release with the label 44 Records in 2004 (Update) produced by Jacky Wagner. Roughly the same program was to be released later in 2007 for You're Everything and also adding two more Steve Gray works to include an original composition and vocal suite. The Update CD release was widely accepted by critics and many details of Steve Gray's arrangements were worked out in the studio.

== Track listing ==
All tracks are written by various composers, all selections arranged and adapted for jazz orchestra by Steve Gray.

No.	Title	Length
1.	"Save Your Love For Me"	3:04
2.	"The Nearness Of You"	5:06
3.	"She's The One"	3:55
4.	"Alone Together"	3:35
5.	"Bitte Geh Nicht Fort"	3:18
6.	"You're Everything"	4:47
7.	"Pennies From Heaven"	4:08
8.	"Sylvia"	5:01
9.	"The Masquerade is Over"	4:39
10.	"Out of the Hush"	5:10
11.	"But Beautiful"	4:59
Total length:		01:01:08

== Recording sessions ==
- 2004, Berlin, Traumton - Studios (17 piece ensemble)

== Personnel ==
=== Musicians ===
- Conductor and solo trombone: Jiggs Whigham
- Arranger: Steve Gray
- Vocals: Marc Secara
- Alto Saxophone: Jonas Schoen, Nico Lohmann
- Tenor Saxophone: Patrick Braun, Thomas Walter
- Baritone Saxophone: Nik Leistle
- Trumpet: Daniel Collette, Jürgen Hahn, Martin Gerwig, Nikolaus Neuser
- Trombone: Arne Fischer, Christoph Hermann, Ralf Zickerick, Simon Harrer
- Piano: Claus-Dieter Bandorf
- Guitar: Jeanfrançois Prins
- Bass: Ralph Graessler
- Drums: Tobias Backhaus
- Percussion: Uli Moritz

=== Production ===
- Executive producer: Jacky Wagner
- Producer: Jiggs Whigham
- Associate Producer: Marc Secara
- Recording engineers: Staff for Traumton - Studios
- Mixing engineer and mastering: Traumton - Studios
- Liner notes: Jacky Wagner

== Reception ==
Professional ratings
Review scores
Source	Rating
Jazz Podium (Germany)	Highly favorable

talented hopefuls for the Big Band...Marc Secara and his Berlin Jazz Orchestra have already acquired a reputation for being equipped with a big voice and tasteful timbre, he is 'guilty of nothing'... What the band, had a 'so-called' Background to offer...a smooth hit.

Jazzpodium

== Release history ==
Region	Date	Label	Format
Germany	March, 2004	44 Records	CD

== See also ==
- Berlin Jazz Orchestra
- Marc Secara
- Jiggs Whigham
