= Radio Judaïca =

Jewish radio station in Belgium

- Brussels; Belgium
- Frequencies: 90.2 MHz; DAB

Programming
- Language: French

Ownership
- Owner: Cercle ben Gurion; (Judaica CBG ASBL)

History
- First air date: 1980

Links
- Website: Official website

Radio Judaica is a French language Jewish radio station in Belgium. The station is based in Brussels.

== History ==
The station was created in 1980 as the first European Jewish radio. The station was successful and had attracted an audience from the Jewish community for its cultural, political and informational programs.

In 1990, the channel had 30,000 to 50,000 daily listeners, including a number of non-Jews on the outskirts of Brussels, attracted by the quality content offered by the station.

In 2003, the president of the station, Arié Renous, was falsely accused of housing illegal immigrants in his residence. Renous, who was also the founder of the station as well as a Holocaust survivor, died in 2008.

The station celebrated its 40th anniversary in 2020.

== Operations and FM ==
The station is currently operated by the Cercle ben Gurion initiative.

Radio Judaica currently broadcasts on 90.2 FM (in analog), and 12B (in digital).

== See also ==
- Jews in Belgium
- Jewish music
- List of radio stations in Belgium
