= Katarzyna Dondalska =

Polish operatic soprano

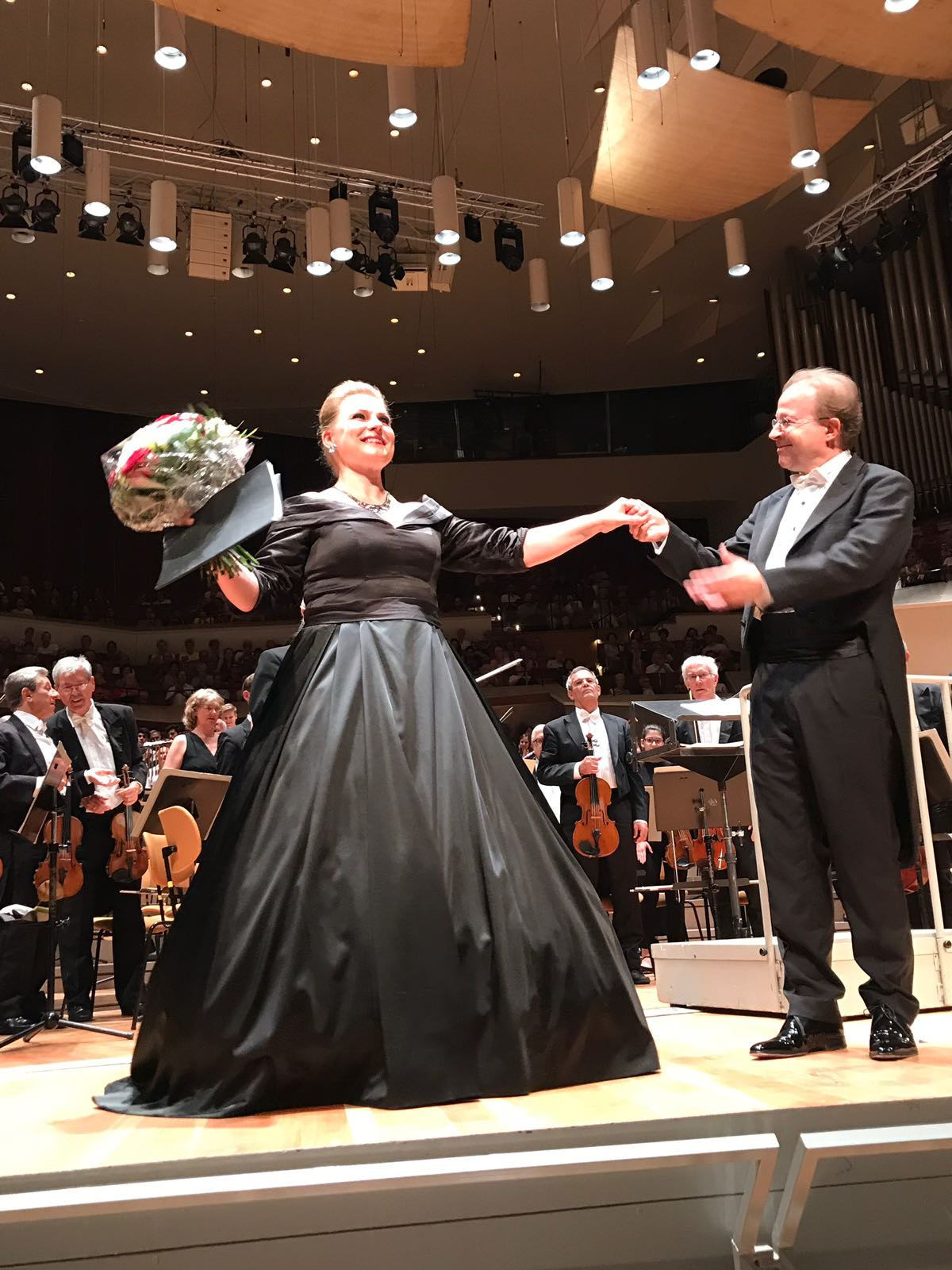
Dondalska at the Berliner Philharmonie, 2018

Katarzyna Dondalska is a Polish coloratura soprano.

Dondalska was born in Bydgoszcz to a family of professional musicians. She started playing violin at the age of 5.

In 2004, she made her US debut playing the Queen of the Night in The Magic Flute at Houston Grand Opera.

In 2015, she received habilitated doctor degree in musical arts, and has since been associate professor at the Art Academy of Szczecin.
