= Steve Gray (musician) =

British pianist, composer and arranger

Steve Gray (18 April 1944 – 20 September 2008) was a British pianist, composer and arranger. He was an active session musician and arranger in the 1970s, and a performer and composer for the KPM 1000 Series of library music recordings. In the 1980s and into the 1990s Gray was a member of the instrumental rock band Sky, and later worked on ambitious arranging and composition projects for big bands in Holland and Germany.

== Early career ==
Gray was born in Middlesbrough, England. At the age of 10, he began teaching himself to play the piano. He joined the Middlesbrough Municipal Jazz Orchestra, at first playing the bassoon but later switching to the saxophone. The orchestra was directed by Ron Aspery, who would go on to create the fusion group Back Door. He moved to London in 1962 and began performing as a pianist in various groups, initially with the Phil Seamen Quintet, and then with various bands led by Harry Bence, Eric Delaney, Mike Cotton and Johnny Howard. In the early 1960s playing in such bands was a recognized training path for becoming a session musician.

== Session musician ==
Under his own name Gray released the album A Woman in Love, in 1969 and he was the pianist on James Kenelm Clarke's Girl on the Beach LP the same year. During the 1970s he was most active as a session musician pianist, playing for UK and US musicians visiting London to record, including John Barry, Sammy Davis Jr, Jerry Fielding, Jerry Goldsmith, Quincy Jones, Peggy Lee, Michel Legrand, Henry Mancini and Lalo Schifrin. He was also a freelance arranger. He handled the arrangement for Melanie Cries Alone, recorded by Consortium in 1970, which was a minor hit in Portugal. He arranged for The Walker Brothers albums No Regrets (1975) and Lines (1976), and for Olivia Newton John (on Come on Over, 1976). He also arranged for Petula Clark and Tom Jones.

== Library music and WASP ==
Gray was involved in many library and production music sessions for KPM which led to opportunities to compose as well as perform. Late in 1972 he founded WASP, a group specifically set up to record library music. Included were Brian Bennett (drums), Clive Hicks (guitar), Duncan Lamont (saxophone) and Dave Richmond (bass guitar). WASP circumvented Musicians' Union restrictions on library music sessions at this period by waiving their session fees and relying on payment through PRS performance royalties and MCPS mechanical rights.

Initial albums by WASP for KPM, all issued in 1973, included The Human Touch (KPM 1118), Look on the Bright Side (KPM 1119), Daybreak (KPM 1120), and Fusion (KPM 1121). One of Gray's pieces, "Snowdrops and Raindrops" from The Human Touch, was issued as a commercial single by EMI. Music by WASP was featured heavily in the television crime drama series The Sweeney, some of it issued on The Hunter (KPM 1157) and Drama (KPM 1168), both 1975.

Gray arranged Jonathan Hodge's score for the Richard Burton film Villain in 1971. At the request of director (and fellow musician) James Kenelm Clarke he composed the score for the British film Exposé in 1976. It was recorded at the KPM Studios at 21 Denmark Street and scored for four violas, percussion, piano and synthesizer.

Gray also composed production music for other labels, including Amphonic and Bruton. Among his compositions is the song "Great Ovation", the opening fanfare of which was used on many tapes from Walt Disney Home Video and its subsidiaries. "Great Ovation" was also featured in the Bruton Music album Televisual which was released in 1984.

== Later career ==
From the late 1970s several discs of his arrangements were issued by the Steve Gray Orchestra, most notably Shades of Gray (1979) and Beatles Orchestral (1982), the latter with guitarist Martin Kershaw.

Gray joined John Williams' band Sky in 1981, replacing Francis Monkman on keyboards, a role he continued until Sky's final live concerts in 1995. From 1991, he worked closely with the North German Radio (NDR) Big Band in Hamburg at the invitation of singer and composer Norma Winstone. On her 1995 album Well Kept Secret Gray arranged Winstone's version of the Jimmy Rowles composition "The Peacocks", retitled "A Timeless Place" from her own lyrics.

From 1998 he worked as guest professor of composition and arrangement in the jazz institute of Berlin's Hochschule für Musik Hanns Eisler also composing and orchestrating the albums Update, You're Everything for the Berlin Jazz Orchestra. Gray was the arranger on Abdullah Ibrahim's Ekapa Lodumo album with the NDR Band in 2001. The WDR Rundfunkorchester Köln posthumously released the CD Europhonia in 2014 which is a 2003 live recording of Gray's music written for the group. Gray was the conductor and musical director for this release.

He was also a respected composer of concert works. These include two operas (Koppelberg, 1989 and Listen to the Earth, 1992, both for W11 Opera), a Requiem for choir and big band, a Guitar Concerto for John Williams and the London Symphony Orchestra (1988), and a Piano Concerto for the French jazz pianist Martial Solal. He also orchestrated compositions by Brian Eno in collaboration with the composer, which were performed by the Holland Metropole Orchestra in 1999. In 2004 the same orchestra performed a concert version of the musical The Singer by Gray and Georgie Fame and featuring Madeline Bell, which was released on record in 2014.

Gray died in September 2008, survived by his wife Heather.

== Discography ==
- A Woman in Love, Steve Gray & His Orchestra, Fontana LPS 16269 (1969)
- Girl on the Beach, James Clarke, Aristocrat AR 1020 (1969) (as pianist)
- The Human Touch KPM 1118 (1973)
- Look on the Bright Side, KPM 1119 (1973)
- Daybreak, KPM 1120 (1973)
- Fusion KPM 1121 (1973)
- The Hunter, KPM 1157 (1975)
- Drama, KPM 1168 (1975)
- No Regrets, Walker Brothers (1975) (as arranger)
- Lines, Walker Brothers (1976) (as arranger)
- Come On Over, Olivia Newton-John (1976) (as arranger)
- Expose, film soundtrack, Vocalion SML 8450 (1976, released 2009)
- Shades of Gray, Amphonic AMPS 1010 (1979)
- Score and Underscore, Bruton BRJ 23 (1981)
- Sky 3, Ariola ASKY 3 (1981)
- Beatles Orchestral, Airtime Records ART 1 (1982)
- Sky 4: Forthcoming, Ariola ASKY 4 (1982)
- Sky Five Live, Ariola 302 169 (1983)
- Cadmium, Sky, Ariola 205 885 (1983)
- Televisual, Bruton BRG 25 (1983)
- The Great Balloon Race, Sky, Epic 26419 (1985)
- Sky-Mozart, Sky, Mercury 832 908-1 (1987)
- Guitar Concerto, John Williams, London Symphony Orchestra, Sony Classical SK 68337 (1996)
- Ekapa Lodumo, Abdullah Ibrahim, NDR Big Band, Tiptoe TIP-888 840 (2001)
- Themes and Dreams, Telmark TMAK 065 (2001), 2 LPs
- Europhonia, WDR Rundfunkorchester Köln, CMO Jazz (2003, released 2014)
- Singer: The Musical, concert version, Proper Records PRPCD120 (2004, released 2014)
- Update, Berlin Jazz Orchestra, 44 Records, LC 12576 (2004)
- You're Everything Berlin Jazz Orchestra, Schoener Hören Records, RBB Kulturradio 4033 (2008)
- Requiem for Choir and Big Band, Skip Records SKP9045 (2014)
