= IAJRC Journal =

American jazz journal

- Editor: Ian Tiele
- Categories: History of jazz
- Frequency: Quarterly
- Format: Print magazine
- Publisher: International Association of Jazz Record Collectors
- Founded: 1968
- Country: United States
- Language: English
- ISSN: 0098-9487
- OCLC: 748504153

The IAJRC Journal is an American quarterly magazine published by the International Association of Jazz Record Collectors. The journal was established in 1968, 4 years after the association was founded in Pittsburgh. The first issue was published during the first quarter of 1968. It covers the history of jazz — which includes the history of jazz criticism and jazz discography.

== History and background ==
The journal reviews about 200 albums and 12 books, annually. One of its sister products is the IAJRC record label, which, as of 2014, has in excess of 77 titles.

The journal is not formally peer reviewed. Because the organization is bent towards rare and old recordings, coverage by the journal leans towards, but is not limited to, historic jazz. Its contributors have mostly been amateur jazz enthusiasts, but also include amateur and professional discographers, jazz critics, musicologists, musicians, music library archivists, and academics.

== Editor ==
Ian R. Tiele ( Brookfield, Illinois) has been the journal's editor since 2012.

=== Former editors ===
- 2006–2011: Andy Simons, jazz guitarist, retired as editor at the end of 2011
- Russ Chase

== Archives ==
- The journal is archived at the Institute of Jazz Studies (Rutgers University)
- 2007–present: EBSCO Information Services
