= Origin Suite =

Studio album by Michael Waldrop
- Released: January 3, 2018
- Recorded: August 2010; June 2016; September 2016; January 11, 2017
- Studio: Crystal Clear Sound, Dallas, Texas; SkyMuse Studio, Seattle, Washington; Ice Station Zebra, Seattle, Washington; KillZone Studios, Los Angeles, California
- Genre: Jazz; big band; Jazz fusion; instrumental; Vocalese
- Length: 1:07:30
- Label: Origin - 82747
- Producer: John Bishop (exec. prod.); Michael Waldrop (prod.); Tim Reppert (assoc. prod.)

Michael Waldrop chronology
Time Within Itself (2015)	Origin Suite (2018)

Jack Cooper chronology
Time Within Itself (2015)	Origin Suite (2018)	Songs of Berlin (2021)

Origin Suite is the second jazz album by Michael Waldrop, produced by award-winning Seattle, Washington-based label Origin Records and released January 3, 2018. The CD idea is a high level, eclectic mix of works showcasing Michael Waldrop. Specifically, the Origin Suite was composed for this CD as a tour de force to showcase Waldrop. Most notably the CD received 4 of 5 stars by music critic and author Brian Morton in the April 2018 edition of Jazz Journal from London.

== Background ==
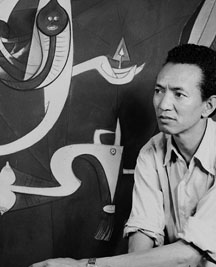
The Origin Suite is inspired by three paintings of Cuban artist Wifredo Lam

After the success of Michael Waldrop's Time Within Itself CD, he decided to approach Origin Records to do a second CD. They agreed and this time a wider set of music was used though still employing Jack Cooper as the primary writer and arranger for the new project. Another substantial grant ($10,000) was obtained by Waldrop from Eastern Washington University to doing a CD.

The Origin Suite (title work) is inspired by three paintings by artist Wifredo Lam: La Jungla, Nativité, Al Final De La Noche. Lam's paintings are primitive and earthy in approach and draw on Caribbean and Central African themes related to Santería and Cuban Vodú culture.

== Promotion ==
The Origin Suite CD got its first promotion with the "Track of The Day" feature with All About Jazz. The track La Jungla was given 3.5 of 5 stars by reviewer Fiona Ord-Shrimpton.

== Reception ==
Professional ratings
Review scores
Source	Rating
All About Jazz	4/5 stars
All About Jazz	3.5/5 stars
Jazz Journal	4/5 stars
Modern Drummer	Very Favorable
Tom Hull	B−
Cadence	Very Favorable

Reviewing for Cadence, Bob Rausch said: "Michael Waldrop [drm/vib] is another artist with past ties to North Texas State and his big band is not traditional as displayed on ORIGIN SUITE. Recorded at various times from August 2010 though July 2017 presented here are a dozen originals mostly by Waldrop. There are also moments for small groupings. Purists will be set off by the lack of continuity in style and manner of the CD, that said, the various styles employed work well. The main influence seems to be Weather Report with its high energy rhythm and electrified pinning. Waldrop picks from a pool of over 25 musicians, uses overdubbing and there is an occasionally use of voice as sweetening to the compositions."

Tom Hull was less impressed, saying Waldrop "runs a big band here, with various bits recorded elsewhere and tacked together. The title suite is rather short, but the album goes on and on, alternately richly expressive and overblown."

== Track listing ==
No.	Title	Writer(s)	Length
1.	"Origin Suite I: La Jungla"	Jack Cooper/Michael Waldrop (arr. J. Cooper)	3:52
2.	"Origin Suite II: Nativité"		3:21
3.	"Origin Suite III: Al Final De La Noche"		3:39
4.	"Through The Mist"	M. Waldrop	5:10
5.	"Sheath and Sword"	J. Cooper	5:55
6.	"Ivana"	M. Waldrop (arr. J. Cooper)	5:41
7.	"Mouzon"	Jimi Tunnell	6:58
8.	"Doo Dat Tang"	M. Waldrop (arr. Gerald Stockton)	5:45
9.	"Belgrade"	M. Waldrop (arr. J. Cooper)	7:19
10.	"Vasconcelos"	M. Waldrop	5:54
11.	"Doppler Effect"	G. Stockton	6:13
12.	"Still Life"	M. Waldrop	7:05

Recording notes

- January 11, 2016 (tracks 1, 2, 3, 5, 6 and 8), Crystal Clear Sound, Dallas, TX
- Summer 2016 (track 7), Buffalo Sound, Denton, TX
- June 2016 (tracks 4 and 10), SkyMuse Studios, Seattle, WA
- September 2016 (tracks 9 and 11), Ice Station Zebra, Seattle, WA
- August 2010 (track 12), KillZone Studios, Los Angeles, CA

== Personnel ==
=== Musicians ===
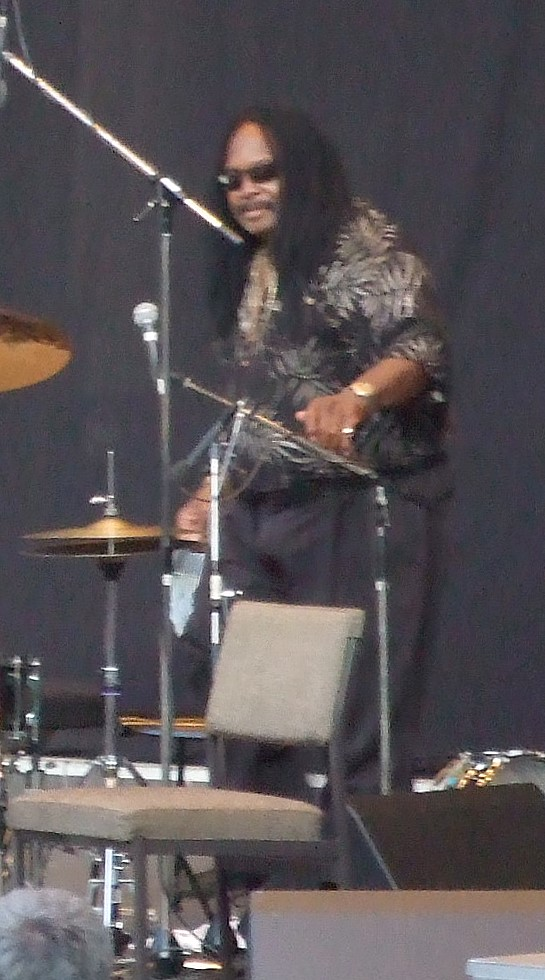
"Mouzon" is dedicated to drummer Alphonse Mouzon.

- Michael Waldrop (all tracks): Drums and Vibraphone (add congas and keyboards for track 11)

Tracks 1, 2, 3, 5, 6, 8

- Jack Cooper: MD/conductor, arranger, composer
- Marc Secara (1–3, 5): Vocal
- Jimi Tunnell (1–3): Guitar/Vocal
- Will Campbell: Alto Saxophone/flute/clarinet/soprano sax
- Tim Ishii: Alto Saxophone/flute/clarinet
- Mario Cruz: Tenor Saxophone/clarinet
- Chris McGuire: Tenor Saxophone/clarinet
- Paul Baker: Baritone Saxophone/bass clarinet
- Keith Jourdan (lead), David Spencer, Larry Spencer, Mike Steinel: Trumpet and flugelhorn
- Anthony Williams (lead), Tony Baker, Greg Waits, John Wasson (bass): Trombone
- Noel Johnstone: Guitar
- Piano: Steve Snyder
- Lynn Seaton (5, 6 and 8): Acoustic bass
- Jeff Plant (1–3): Electric bass
- José Rossy: percussion

Track 7

- Scott Kinsey: Keyboards
- Jeff Plant: Electric bass
- Jimi Tunnell (1–3): Guitar/Vocal
- Mario Cruz: Tenor Saxophone
- José Rossy: percussion

Tracks 9, 11

- Alto Saxophone/soprano sax: Travis Ranney
- Richard Cole: Tenor Saxophone/baritone Saxophone
- Stephen Friel (11): Baritone Saxophone
- Brad Allison (9), Keith Jordan (11): Trumpet/flugelhorn
- Dan Marcus (9), Scott Whitfield (11): Trombone
- Brian Monroney: Guitar
- John Hansen (9): Piano
- Barry Aiken (11): Keyboards
- Rick White (11): Bass
- Brad Dutz (9): Percussion

Tracks 4, 10

- Larry Panella: Flutes
- Brad Dutz: Percussion
- John Hansen: Piano
- Scott Steed (10): Acoustic bass
- Chris Symer (4): Bass

Track 12

- Wayne Peet: Piano
- Brad Dutz: Percussion
- Joel Hamilton: Bass

=== Production ===
- John Bishop: Executive Producer
- Michael Waldrop: Producer
- Tim Reppert: Associate Producer
- Kent Stump, Jimi Tunnell, Michael Lewis, Dave Dysart, Steve Gamberoni, Paul Nowell, Anthony Panella, Wentoa Xing: Recording engineers
- Tim Reppert: Editing and mix engineer (Soundtrack Studios, Boston and REP Studio, Ithaca, NY.)
- Scott Kinsey: Mastering
- Michael Waldrop: Liner notes
- John Bishop: Cover design and layout
- Daniel Pardo and Ivana Cojbasic: Liner photographs:

== Charts ==
Year	Chart	Type	Song/Album	Peak Position	Chart Date
2018	JazzWeek Airplay Reporting	Album	Origin Suite	67	February 26
2018	WUMR Jazz 20 Countdown	Album	Origin Suite	4	February 25 thru March 3

== Release history ==
Region	Date	Label	Format
Canada	January 19, 2018	Origin Records	CD, digital download
United Kingdom	January 19, 2018	Origin Records	CD, digital download
Japan	January 19, 2018	Origin Records	CD, digital download
United States	January 19, 2018	Origin Records	CD, digital download
Europe (Germany)	January 19, 2018	Origin Records	CD, digital download

== See also ==
- Origin Records
- Michael Waldrop
- Jack Cooper
- Marc Secara
- List of jazz arrangers
