= Eric Watson (musician) =

American classical composer (born 1955)

- Born: July 5, 1955 (age 71); Wellesley, Massachusetts, U.S.
- Genres: Jazz
- Instrument: Piano
- Label: ACT Music

Eric Watson (born July 5, 1955) is an American jazz pianist.

== Early life and education ==
Watson was born in Wellesley, Massachusetts. He began playing piano as a child and performed in rock bands in Massachusetts. He studied classical music at the Oberlin Conservatory of Music in Oberlin, Ohio.

== Career ==
After graduating from college in 1978, Watson moved to Paris, where he performed jazz and classical music and worked as an accompanist for a dance group. is signed to a long-term recording contract with ACT Music. He has worked with double bass player John Lindberg, drummer Ed Thigpen, and Steve Lacy.

== Discography ==
- Bulls Blood (1980)
- Conspiracy (1982)
- Child in the Sky (1985)
- Piano One (1985) (various artists compilation)
- Your Tonight Is My Tomorrow (1987)
- Charles Ives (1991)
- Palimpseste (1991)
- Listen to the Night (1994)
- Punk Circus (1994)
- Silent Hearts (1999)
- Full Metal Quartet (2000)
- Sketches of Solitude (2002)
- Road Movies (2004)
- Midnight Torsion (2009)
- Memories of Paris (2010)

With Steve Lacy

- Spirit of Mingus (Free Lance, 1992)
- Clangs (hat ART, 1993)

== External links and sources ==
- http://nfo.net/calendar/jul05.htm
- http://www.actmusic.com/artist_detail.php?bio=1&manufacturers_id=28
