= Gordon Stout =

American composer and percussionist

Gordon Stout (born 1952) is an American percussionist, composer, and educator specializing in the marimba.

He studied composition with Joseph Schwantner, Samuel Adler, and Warren Benson, and percussion with James Salmon and John Beck. Many of his compositions for marimba (i.e., Two Mexican Dances for Marimba from 1977, and the Astral Dance) have become standard repertoire for marimba players worldwide.

As a marimba player, he has presented solo performances throughout the United States and Canada, as well as in Europe, Japan, Taiwan, and Mexico. In the summer of 1998 he was a featured marimba performer at the World Marimba Festival in Osaka, Japan. His students include David Hall, Alex Jacobowitz and Dane Richeson. He is a member of the Percussive Arts Society Hall of Fame.

Stout served as professor of percussion at the School of Music of Ithaca College in Ithaca, New York. He retired in 2019.

== See also ==
- Marimba
- Time Frames
