= You're Everything (album) =

Studio album by Marc Secara Jiggs Whigham Berlin Jazz Orchestra
- Released: March 1, 2008
- Recorded: March 12–15, 2007; Berlin, Germany
- Genres: Jazz, Big band, instrumental
- Length: 55:59
- Labels: Schoener Hören Records; RBB Kulturradio 4033
- Producers: Marc Secara (exec. prod.); Jiggs Whigham (prod.); Ulf Drechsel (assoc. prod.)

Berlin Jazz Orchestra chronology
Update (2004)	You're Everything (2008)	Strangers in the Night (2012)

Marc Secara chronology
States of Mind (2007)	You're Everything (2007)	Mord ist mein Geschäft, Liebling (2009)

You're Everything is a jazz album produced by Schoener Hören Records and Kulturradio, it was officially released in March 2008. The album was critically acclaimed by Jazz Podium magazine as the second recording for the Berlin Jazz Orchestra with vocal artist Marc Secara. Jazz artist Jiggs Whigham is featured on this release as both instrumentalist (trombone) and musical director.

== Background ==
After being founded in 2000, the Berlin Jazz Orchestra had their first demo release with the label 44 Records in 2004 (Update), produced by Jacky Wagner. Roughly the same program was to be released later in 2007 for You're Everything. The Update CD release paved the way for creating a fine demo and test CD where many details of Steve Gray's arrangements were worked out in studio.

== Track listing ==
All tracks are written by various composers, all selections arranged and adapted for jazz orchestra by Steve Gray.

No.	Title	Length
1.	"Save Your Love for Me"	3:04
2.	"The Nearness of You"	5:06
3.	"She's the One"	3:55
4.	"Alone Together"	3:35
5.	"Bitte Geh Nicht Fort"	3:18
6.	"You're Everything"	4:47
7.	"Childhood Suite: A Child Is Born"	8:08
8.	"Little Niles"
9.	"Waltz for Debbie"
10.	"Open the Box"	5:14
11.	"Pennies From Heaven"	4:08
12.	"Sylvia"	5:01
13.	"The Masquerade is Over"	4:39
14.	"Out of the Hush"	5:10
15.	"But Beautiful"	4:59
Total length:		01:01:08

== Recording sessions ==
- March 12–15, 2007 (17 piece ensemble)
- May 21, 2014 (strings only)
- All instrumental tracks recorded at RBB Studios in Berlin, Germany.
- Vocal tracks recorded at Bob Music Studio, Berlin

== Personnel ==
=== Musicians ===
- Conductor and solo trombone: Jiggs Whigham
- Arranger: Steve Gray
- Vocals: Marc Secara
- Alto Saxophone: Jonas Schoen, Nico Lohmann
- Tenor Saxophone: Patrick Braun, Thomas Walter
- Baritone Saxophone: Nik Leistle
- Trumpet: Daniel Collette, Jürgen Hahn, Martin Gerwig, Nikolaus Neuser
- Trombone: Arne Fischer, Christoph Hermann, Ralf Zickerick, Simon Harrer
- Piano: Claus-Dieter Bandorf
- Guitar: Jeanfrançois Prins
- Bass: Ralph Graessler
- Drums: Tobias Backhaus
- Percussion: Uli Moritz

=== Production ===
- Contractor (strings): Clemens Lindner
- Executive producer: Marc Secara
- Producer: Jiggs Whigham
- Associate producer: Ulf Dreschsel
  for RBB Kulturradio
- Recording engineers: Wolfgang Hoff, Willi Leopold, and Bobert Matt
  for RBB Kulturradio
- Mixing engineer and mastering: Volker Greve at Studio Greve
- Liner notes: Jiggs Whigham
- Photography: Christoph Musiol
- Art/Design: Dominik Schech

== Critical reception ==
Professional ratings
Review scores
Source	Rating
Jazz Podium	Highly favorable

"Marc Secara and his Berlin Jazz Orchestra present with You're Everything a lavishly produced CD. Contributing flattering, powerful, and despite his youth, a secure voice and soulful interpretations that are not too corny, just as did the rousing original arrangements by Steve Gray, the funky brass riffs and jazzy solos of a big band under the direction of trombone soloist Jiggs Whigham. The strings remain subtly in the background."

"... an unconditional recommendation for all friends of an 'old crooner.' Tasty and sure past footsteps, Secara makes big steps of his own."

— Jazzpodium

== Release history ==
Region	Date	Label	Format
Germany	March 7, 2008	NRW RBB Kulturradio	CD, digital download
United Kingdom	March 7, 2008	NRW RBB Kulturradio	CD, digital download
Japan	March 7, 2008	NRW RBB Kulturradio	CD, digital download
United States	March 25, 2008	NRW RBB Kulturradio	CD, digital download

== See also ==
- Berlin Jazz Orchestra
- Marc Secara
- Jiggs Whigham
