= Consortium (band) =

British psychedelic pop music group

- Origin: England
- Genres: Psychedelic pop
- Years active: 1960s to 1970s
- Labels: Pye, Trend
- Spinoff of: Group 66

West Coast Consortium, or simply Consortium, were a British psychedelic pop group which recorded for Pye Records between 1967 and 1970. They were best known for the single "All the Love in the World".

== Background ==
The band was originally formed as Group 66, consisting of Robbie Fair (also named Robbie Leggat, lead vocals), Geoff Simpson (lead guitar, backing vocals), Brian Bronson (rhythm guitar), John Barker (bass), and John Podbury (drums). They started out doing covers, but later started to write their own songs. They became a harmony-singing group in the mould of The Beach Boys and The Four Seasons. They were first renamed XIT, and after they were signed to Pye Records, they changed the name again to West Coast Consortium.

== Career ==
=== 1960s ===
The band released "All the Love in the World" under the shortened name of Consortium in 1969, which reached No. 22 on the UK Singles Chart, and No. 11 on the Dutch chart. They released a few more singles but these failed to chart. Although Pye had offered the band a chance to record an album, the band did not record any album at that time.

On the week of 24 March 1969, their single "When the Day Breaks" entered the Dutch Tipparade chart at no. 12.

=== 1970s ===
In 1970, the band moved on to the Trend label which was run by Barry Class who managed The Foundations.

In 1971, the group had a single released, "Annabella " bw "Tell Me My Friend" on Trend 6099 004.

On the week of 12 September 1971, their single "Melanie Cries Alone" made its debut at no. 18 on the Top 20 TMP chart in Portugal. Spending another week in the chart, it got to no. 13.

The lineup underwent a number of changes in the 1970s. Simpson left the band as he was unwilling to leave his young family to go on a tour in Italy in 1970, and he was replaced by Billy Mangham. keyboardist John Caley was also added to the lineup. Later Brian Bronson and John Barker also left, as did Mangham. The band drafted in new members Brian Parker (guitar), Ken Brown (bass), but Podbury and Caley then left, to be replaced by John Albert Parker (Brian's brother) on drums, while Mick Ware also joined as second lead guitarist. The band went on with a much heavier almost psychedelic style. The band recorded an album in 1975, Rebirth, but it was not released and the band broke up without any album released.

== Later years ==
A 27-track anthology of their recordings was later released in 2003. The only album that they recorded, Rebirth, was only released in 2006. Further collections of previously unreleased material have since been released.

== Discography ==
=== Albums ===
- Looking Back: The Pye Anthology (2003)
- Rebirth (2006)
- Mr. Umbrella Man (A Collection Of Demos 1967-1969) (2008)
- 13th Hour (2010)
- All The Love In World: The Complete Recordings 1964 - 1972. (2024)

=== Singles ===
- "Some Other Someday" (1967)
- "Colour Sergeant Lilywhite" (1968)
- "All the Love in the World" b/w "Spending My Life Saying Goodbye" (1969)
- "When the Day Breaks" b/w "The Day the Train Never Came" (1969)
- "Beggar Man" b/w "Cynthia Serenity" (1969)
- "I Don't Want Her Anymore" (1969)
- "Melanie Cries Alone" (1970)
- "Annabella" (1971)
- "Sunday In The Park" (1972)
