= International Association of Jazz Record Collectors =

US-based non-profit organization

The International Association of Jazz Record Collectors (IAJRC) is an international, non-profit organization devoted to the appreciation and preservation of recorded jazz. IAJRC has its own label, IAJRC Records.

== History ==
IAJRC was founded 62 years ago (1964) in Pittsburgh by William C. Love. The organization incorporated in 1975 in Ohio as a non-profit entity, classified by the IRS as a 501(c)(3). The incorporators were James H. Beauchamp, Edward L. Shank, and Leo F. Krebs (born 1937), all of Dayton. The organization has published the IAJRC Journal four times a year for the past 58 years (since 1968), and has produced over 77 titles for IAJRC Records. Many peers, including TV and radio historian Tim Brooks, regard the IAJRC as a scholarly organization.
