= Peter Herbolzheimer =

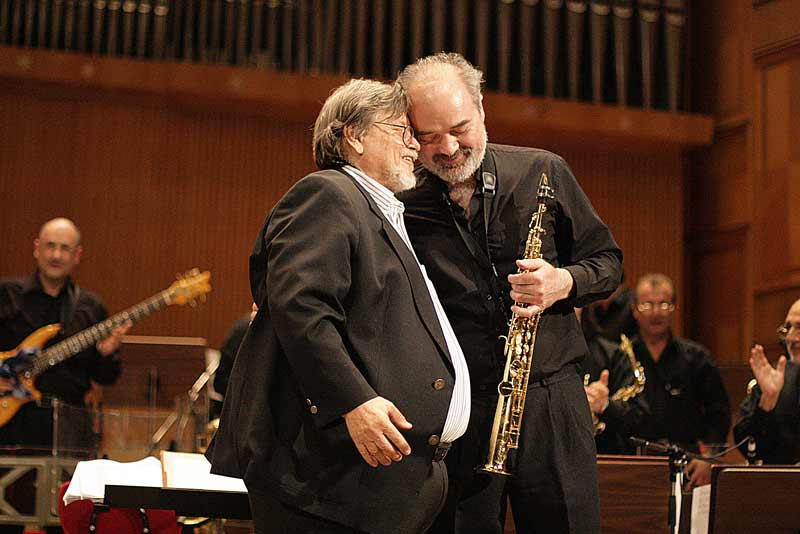
- Peter Herbolzheimer (left) and Nicolae Simion

Background information
- Born: Peter Alexandru Herbolzheimer; 31 December 1935; Bucharest, Romania
- Died: 27 March 2010 (aged 74) Cologne, Germany
- Genre: Jazz
- Occupation: Musician
- Instrument: Trombone

Peter Alexandru Herbolzheimer (German: [ˌpeːtɐ ˈhɛʁbɔlt͡sˌhaɪ̯mɐ]; 31 December 1935 – 27 March 2010) was a Romanian-German jazz trombonist and bandleader.

== Biography ==
Herbolzheimer was born to a Romanian mother and a German father in Bucharest, Romania. His family emigrated in 1951 from Communist Romania to West Germany. In 1953, he moved to the United States, where he enrolled in Highland Park high school in Michigan, graduating in 1954. He was a member of choral groups and orchestra and played guitar in bands in Detroit. In 1957, he returned to Germany and began playing valve trombone in "open mike" groups. He returned to Michigan, but his visa was denied.

For one year he studied at the Nuremberg Conservatory. In the 1960s, he played with the Nuremberg radio dance orchestra and with Bert Kämpfert's orchestra. In 1968, he became a member of the pit orchestra of Hamburg theater (Deutsches Schauspielhaus) directed by Hans Koller. In 1969, he formed the Rhythm Combination and Brass big band for which he wrote most of the arrangements. In the late 1970s, the band toured successfully with a "jazz gala" program with guest stars such as Esther Phillips, Stan Getz, Nat Adderley, Gerry Mulligan, Toots Thielemans, Clark Terry, and Albert Mangelsdorff. In later years, the band played concert tours, television shows, and jazz festivals.

In 1972, Herbolzheimer wrote music for the Edelhagen Band's opening of the Olympic Games in Munich. In 1974, Herbolzheimer's band entered an annual television competition in the Belgian seaside resort Knokke, winning the Golden Swan Award. He also won the International Jazz Composers Competition 1974 in Monaco. Herbolzheimer's arrangements combine swing, Latin music, and rock music.

In the 1970s and 1980s, Herbolzheimer led his orchestra for German television networks with guest musicians such as Ella Fitzgerald, Benny Goodman, Sammy Davis Jr., Dizzy Gillespie, and Al Jarreau. Between 1987 and 2006, Herbolzheimer was the musical director of Germany's national youth jazz orchestra, the Bundes Jazz Orchester. He conducted regular workshops and clinics for big band jazz. In 2007, he was chosen music director, arranger, and conductor of the European Jazz Band, which toured throughout Europe until 2009.

Herbolzheimer died at the age of 74 in his hometown of Cologne, Germany on 27 March 2010.

== Personnel ==
Brass players included Allan Botschinsky (Denmark), Art Farmer (U.S.), Dusko Goykovich (Serbia), Palle Mikkelborg (Denmark), Ack van Rooyen (Netherlands) and Jiggs Whigham (U.S.) The rhythm section consisted of two keyboards, guitar, bass, drums and percussion and included Dieter Reith (Germany), Philip Catherine (Belgium), Niels-Henning Ørsted Pedersen (Denmark), Bo Stief (Denmark), Alex Riel (Denmark), Grady Tate (U.S.), and Nippy Noya (Indonesia).

== Discography ==
- Soul Condor (MPS, 1970)
- My Kind Of Sunshine (MPS, 1970)
- Wide Open (MPS, 1973)
- Waitaminute (MPS, 1973)
- Scenes (MPS, 1974)
- Live im Onkel Pö (Polydor, 1975)
- The Catfish (Polydor, 1975)
- Hip Walk (Polydor, 1976)
- Jazz Gala Concert 1976 – Koala Reco (Bellaphon)
- Touch Down (1977)
- Jazz Gala 77 – Telefunken/Decca
- I hear Voices, 1978 (Polydor)
- Quality, 1978 (Acanto/Bellaphon)
- Jazz Gala Concert 79 – Rare Bid/Bellaphon
- Toots Suite – Alanna
- Dreißig Jahre – Live in Concert – Mons (SunnyMoon)
- Colours of a Band – Mons (SunnyMoon)
- Masterpieces – MPS-Record (Universal)
- Music for Swinging Dancers, 1984 (Koal Reco)
- Latin Groove, 1987 – Koala Reco (Bellaphon)
- Fat Man Boogie, 1981 – Koala Reco (Bellaphon)
- Fatman 2, 1983 – Koala Reco (Bellaphon)
- Bandfire, 1981 – Koala Reco (Bellaphon)
- Smile – Koala Reco (Bellaphon)
- Friends and Silhouettes – Koala Reco (Bellaphon)
- Big Band Bebop, 1984 – Koala/Bellaphon
- More Bebop, 1984 – Koala
- Harlem Story, 1984; Koala
- Colors of a Band, 1995 (with Dianne Reeves)
