= Berlin Jazz Orchestra =

German concert jazz orchestra

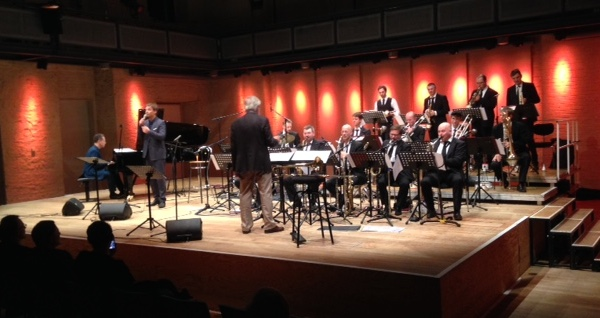

Background information
- Origin: Berlin, Germany
- Genres: Jazz, big band
- Years active: 2000–present
- Labels: Polydor/Universal, GAM, Schoener Hören
- Website: www.berlinjazzorchestra.de

The Berlin Jazz Orchestra is a 17 piece concert jazz orchestra based in Berlin, Germany. The orchestra has been critically acclaimed by prominent periodicals such as the Berliner Tagesspiegel, Märkische Allgemeine, Jazzpodium, All About Jazz and Jazzthetik.

The group was founded by singer Marc Secara and jazz trombonist Jiggs Whigham in 2000. The group was formed in part as a reaction to the financial problems and elimination of the RIAS Big Band. The ensemble had their first demo release with the label 44 Records in 2004. The Update CD release paved the way for their first international CD release of 2007: You're Everything on Schoener Hören Records/Kulturradio featuring Marc Secara and the big band/string arrangements of Steve Gray. They also released the Strangers in the Night (music of Bert Kaempfert) DVD with Polydor/Universal Music in 2012 which features soloists Ack van Rooyen, Herb Geller, Ladi Geisler and Jiggs Whigham. In 2014 Secara hired arranger and conductor Jack Cooper to collaborate on the new Songs of Berlin BJO project and CD recording. Initial premieres of this music were part of the 15th Anniversary of the group being celebrated during 2015/2016.

The BJO features studio musicians in the Berlin and Northern Germany region and has performed numerous concerts to include artistic collaborations with the New York Voices, Patti Austin, Manfred Krug, Joja Wendt, Jocelyn B. Smith, Uschi Brüning and Pe Werner. Recent performances have been at the Frankfurt Jazz Festival, the Sonneberg Jazzfest, Nordhaus Jazzfestival and the Jazzfest Köpenick. The group is also featured on the soundtrack for the 2009 Warner Bros. movie release Mord ist mein Geschäft, Liebling. Further premieres of "Songs of Berlin" project were at the Kunstfabrik Schlot in Berlin (March 9) and three-day music festival "Werder klingt" celebrating the 700th anniversary of the city of Werder (Havel) on March 10, 2017 featuring Uschi Brüning. The group also performed in Reinsberg as the warm up performance for the recording of two CDs to be produced for 2019. The second of the two CDs (beyond "Songs of Berlin") is Crosscurrent composed and arranged by Jonas Schoen.

== Members ==
- Marc Secara, Jiggs Whigham, co-leaders
- Jonas Schoen, lead alto saxophone
- Nico Lohmann, alto saxophone
- Patrick Braun, tenor saxophone
- Thomas Walter, tenor saxophone
- Nik Leistle, baritone saxophone
- Benny Brown/Skip Reinhardt, lead trumpet
- Martin Gerwig, trumpet
- Jürgen Hahn, trumpet
- Nikolaus Neuser, trumpet
- Christoph Hermann, trombone
- Simon Harrer, trombone
- Jan Yaren, trombone
- Arne Fischer, bass trombone
- Jeanfrançois Prins, guitar
- Claus-Dieter Bandorf, piano
- Ralph Graessler, bass
- Tobias Backhaus, drums

=== Past members ===
- Daniel Collette, trumpet

== Discography ==
- 2004 Update (44 Records)
- 2007 You're Everything (Schoener Hören Records)
- 2009 Mord ist mein Geschäft, Liebling - movie soundtrack
- 2012 Strangers In Night - The Music Of Bert Kaempfert DVD (Polydor/Universal)
- 2021 Songs of Berlin (GAM Records)
- 2022 Crosscurrent (Schoener Hören Records)

== See also ==
- Marc Secara
- Jiggs Whigham
- Jeanfrançois Prins
