= Jimi Tunnell =

American guitarist

- Born: Denton, Texas, U.S.
- Genres: Pop, R&B, jazz, classical
- Occupation: Musician
- Instruments: Guitar, vocals
- Years active: 1980–present
- Label: Art of Life
- Website: www.jimitunnell.com

Jimi Tunnell is an American guitarist and vocalist from Denton, Texas. Although he is known as a guitarist, his career began as a jazz trumpeter.

Tunnell has worked with Yukihiro Takahashi, Laurie Anderson, Steps Ahead, and Members Only. His band Trilateral Commission includes percussionist José Rossy of Weather Report. He is a member of the Rodney Holmes Trio, which includes bassist Alphonso Johnson, also from Weather Report. He is a featured artist on the Origin Records releases Time Within Itself and Origin Suite.

He sang the chorus on the two first hits by singer Shannon, Let the Music Play and Give Me Tonight, although he was uncredited.
