= Jeanfrançois Prins =

Belgian jazz musician (born 1967)

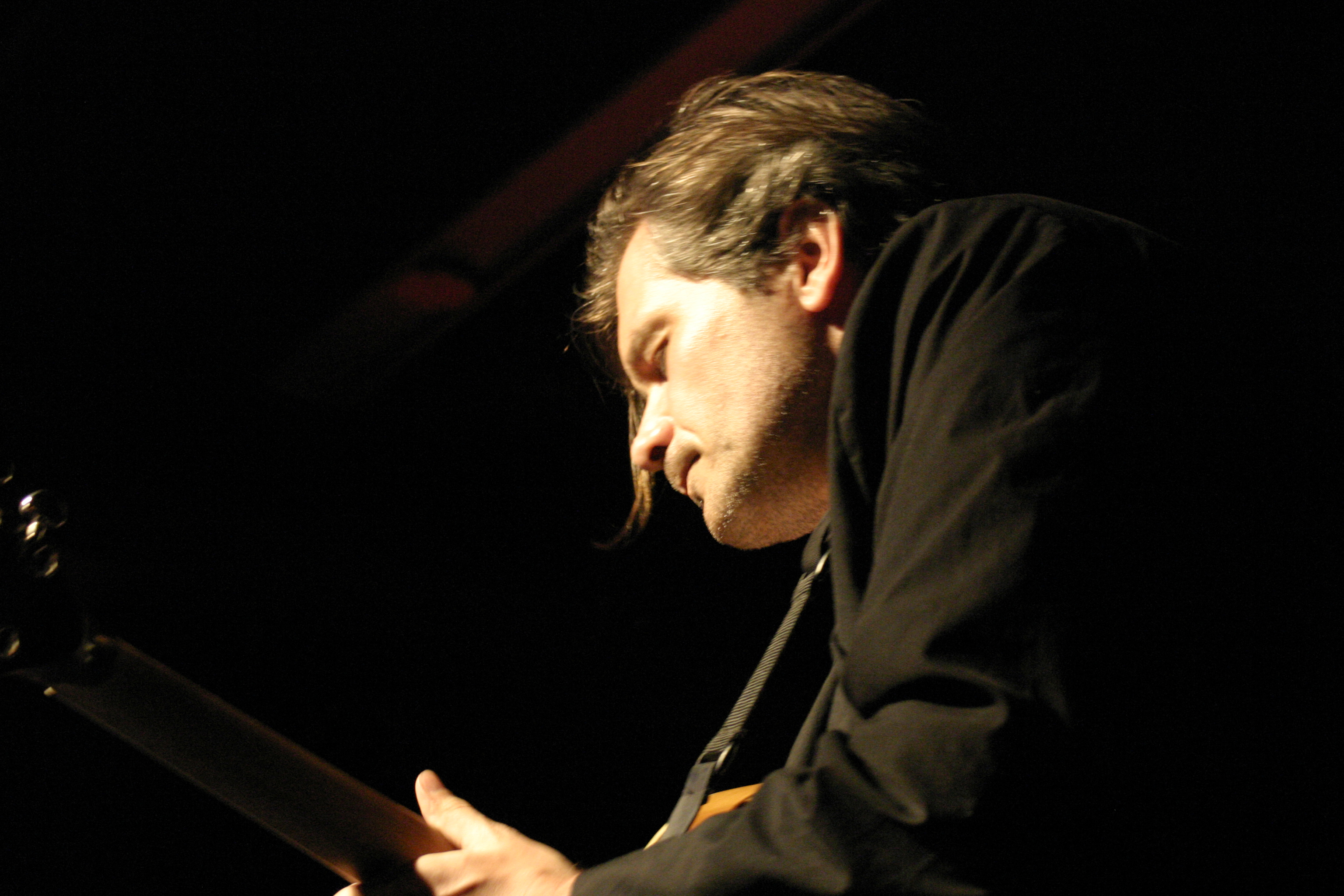
- Prins playing guitar

Background information
- Born: 18 February 1967 (age 59); Brussels, Belgium
- Genres: Jazz; Latin jazz; free jazz
- Occupations: Musician, record producer
- Instruments: Guitar, vocals
- Years active: 1985 - present
- Labels: GAM RECORDS, Challenge
- Member of: Berlin Jazz Orchestra
- Website: www.jeanfrancoisprins.com

Jeanfrançois Prins (born 18 February 1967) is a Belgian jazz guitarist, composer, vocalist and record producer. He has spent many years between New York City and Berlin where he was leading the Jazz Guitar departments in both music universities (UdK and HfM Hanns Eisler) for a total of 12 years. Upon his return to Belgium in 2016, he became the CEO of the GAM Records label in 2017.

== Career ==
Jeanfrançois Prins began playing guitar when at eighteen years of age. A year later, he formed a band and performed in Brussels. His mentor was Toots Thielemans, who was known worldwide as a harmonica player but has started his career as a jazz guitarist. Other influences of Prins include jazz artists Lee Konitz, Miles Davis, and Kenny Werner.

Prins graduated from college in Brussels with a degree in audio engineering. From 1988 to 1992, he studied jazz and guitar at the Royal Conservatory of Music, Brussels. Prins moved to New York City in 1993, he became a part of the contemporary jazz scene, to include vocalist Judy Niemack, who would later become his wife. He was the arranger/producer and guitarist for several of her albums. The two divorced in 2016. He moved back to Brussels in 2017, where he became the director of GAM Records, an independent record company that specialises in jazz. He is the third generation of the family that has produced and promoted jazz in Brussels since the 1940s. He now lives in Brussels with his family.

Prins has performed live and recorded with Toots Thielemans, Randy Brecker, Eddie Gomez, Gary Foster, Fred Hersch, Billy Hart, Tim Hagans, Lew Tabackin, Lee Konitz, Mal Waldron, Theo Bleckmann, Kenny Wheeler, Gary Bartz, Victor Lewis, Cameron Brown, Jay Clayton, Jay Anderson, Ray Drummond, Adam Nussbaum, Kelvin Sholar, Kirk Nurock, Jiggs Whigham, Jim McNeely, Walter Norris, Stephen Scott, Quincy Jones, Ivan Lins, Patti Austin, and Kirk Lightsey. Since 2000, he has worked with the Berlin Jazz Orchestra.

== Recordings ==
All Around Town (TCB), was inspired as his own perceptions and musical photo album of New York City. The album is recorded trio a trio: bassist Mike Richmond and drummer Adam Nussbaum, plus saxophonist Lee Konitz as a guest. His fifth CD, Light (GAM Music), is co-led by drummer Steve Davis.

El Gaucho (Challenge, 2012) was recorded in New York City, with his NYC trio: Joris Teepe (bass) and Victor Lewis (drums) and tenor saxophonist Rich Perry as guest on specific tracks. El Gaucho is an example of his concepts of interactive trio and quartet playing with originals, standards and modern jazz compositions.

Blue Note Mode (GAM, 2024) was recorded at the iconic Van Gelder Studio in New Jersey, with his NYC All Stars band: Danny Grisset (piano), Jay Anderson (bass) and E.J. Strickland (drums) and alto saxophonist Jaleel Shaw, and trumpeter Jeremy Pelt as guests on specific tracks. Blue Note Mode presents music of a 21st century jazz musician, who grew up to love modern jazz which grooves deeply. A large majority of those legendary recordings of the 60s and beyond were created in the Van Gelder studio.

Prins' compositions are often performed and recorded, not only by his own bands, but by several other European and American jazz artists. His composition New York Stories has been performed and recorded by numerous artists. This list includes his own quintet, Toots Thielemans, Judy Niemack, Kenny Werner, Michel Herr and Jack van Poll. In addition, larger and more commercial groups have used his music such as the WDR Big Band, Danish Radio Big Band, Jazz Terrassa Big Band, Lisa Werlinder and he has the title song of the Radio Judaica Jazz Program in Belgium. Other compositions of Prins: Central Park is recorded and performed by his trio, Ulli Jünemann's quartet; Music Calls Me by Judy Niemack (with her original English lyrics); Sommar by Lisa Werlinder. Being a sound engineer, Prins has produced and arranged Mary Kay's CD, Make Someone Happy, featuring Toots Thielemans. He has also co-produced three CDs for Judy Niemack and others by Richard Rousselet, Walter Norris and Sören Fischer.

Prins has been featured on television both in interviews and performing in Europe, the U.S., and on the satellite channel Muzzik. In 1994, he was an actor and musician in the Belgian movie Just Friends, which won accolades and nominated for an Oscar as "Best Foreign Film". In early 1999, the French-speaking Belgian television (RTBF) produced a special documentary feature about his international career, both as a musician and educator: Brussels - Berlin – New York - Jeanfrançois Prins. It was aired on the worldwide French language channel TV5 in the summer of 1999. This was followed with an interviewed in New York City by a RTBF News team during 2006 as a report about the fifth anniversary of September 11.

Jeanfrançois has written original music for movie soundtracks as well as television to include the Discovery Channel in 2000, and the short film Coriolis in 2008.

He has also been teaching private instrument lessons and classes in Berlin's Music Universities, where he led the Jazz Guitar Departments for over a decade, at the ARTEZ Jazz School in Enschede, the Netherlands for a year, and gives workshops and master-classes in Europe and the U.S.

== Discography ==
=== As leader ===
- New York Stories (GAM, 1991)
- Beauty and the Prince with guests Fred Hersch and Judy Niemack (AMC, 1993, GAM, 2003)
- Live at the Manhattan Jazz Club with guest Lee Konitz (GAM, 1995)
- All Around Town with Mike Richmond (musician) and adam Nussbaum, guest Lee Konitz (TCB, 1999)
- Light with Steve Davis (American drummer) (GAM, 2001)
- El Gaucho with Victor Lewis, and Joris Teepe, + guest Rich Perry (Challenge, 2012)
- Avant un Rêve with Charles Loos and Sébastien Walnier (GAM, 2018)
- Blue Note Mode with Danny Grissett, Jay Anderson, E.J. Strickland, + guests Jaleel Shaw, and Jeremy Pelt (GAM, 2024)

=== As sideman ===
With Lee Konitz

- 1993 Rhapsody
- 1996 Rhapsody, Vol. 2

With Judy Niemack

- 1992 Straight Up: with Toots Thielemans, Jeanfrançois Prins, Kenny Werner, Scott Colley, Adam Nussbaum, Peter Eldridge, Theo Bleckmann, Mark Feldman, Café,
- 1996 Night and the Music: with Jeanfrançois Prins (guitar, producer), Kenny Werner, Ray Drummond, Billy Hart, Erik Friedlander,
- 2002 About Time: with Lee Konitz, Jeanfrançois Prins (guitar, producer), Eddie Gomez, Café
- 2007 Blue Nights: with Gary Bartz, Jeanfrançois Prins (guitar, producer), Jim McNeely, Dennis Irwin, Victor Lewis, Don Sickler
- 2009 In the Sundance: with Jeanfrançois Prins (guitar, vocals, producer), Bruce Barth, Rufus Reid, Bruno Castellucci
- 2023 Voices in Flight: with Jeanfrançois Prins (guitar, producer), Jay Clayton (musician), Jay Anderson, John Di Martino

As guest artist

- 1991 Make Someone Happy --- Mary Kay, with Toots Thielemans, Jeanfrançois Prins (guitar, producer), Jean Warland, Nathalie Loriers, Dré Pallemaerts,
- 1993 Just friends --- (Michel Herr & Archie Shepp) (movie soundtrack)
- 1994 Waitin' for You --- Richard Rousselet
- 2004 Update (44 Records) --- Berlin Jazz Orchestra
- 2008 And So Am I --- Darmon Meader
- 2012 Boo Hoo--- Ulli Jünemann
- 2013 Duology --- Stéphane Mercier
- 2013 Ornette et Cetera --- Uschi Brüning, Michael Griener, Ernst-Ludwig Petrowsky
- 2018 My Voice is My Plea --- Maria Palatine
- 2021 Songs of Berlin (GAM Music) --- Berlin Jazz Orchestra
- 2022 Belgian Jazz All Stars - Mixology live --- Stéphane Mercier
- 2023 Le Pouvoir des Mots (Unlimited Music France) --- Sarah Lancman
