= Jiggs Whigham =

American jazz trombonist

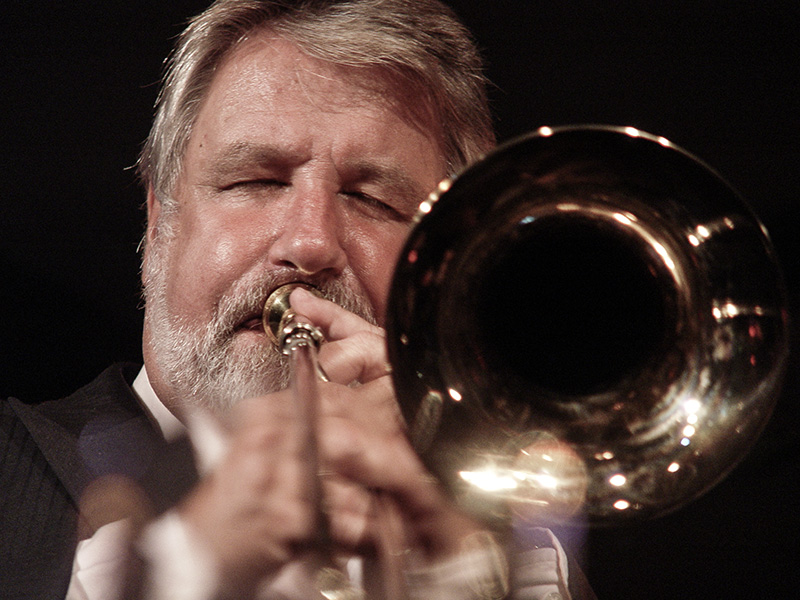

Background information
- Born: Oliver Haydn Whigham III; August 20, 1943 (age 82); Cleveland, Ohio, U.S.
- Genres: Jazz
- Occupation: Musician
- Instrument: Trombone
- Years active: 1960–present
- Website: jiggswhigham.com

Jiggs Whigham (born Oliver Haydn Whigham III; August 20, 1943) is an American jazz trombonist.

== Biography ==
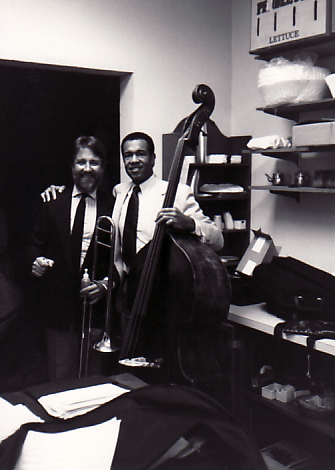
Jiggs Whigham and John Clayton in 1989, photo courtesy of the Fraser MacPherson estate

Born in Cleveland, Ohio, U.S., he began his professional career at the age of 17, joining the Glenn Miller/Ray McKinley orchestra in 1961. He left that band for Stan Kenton, where he played in the touring "mellophonium" band in 1963, then settled in New York City to play commercially.

Frustrated with commercial playing, Whigham migrated to Germany, where he still lives. He taught at the Hochschule für Musik in Berlin. He played for many years in the big band of Kurt Edelhagen, was a featured soloist in the Bert Kaempfert orchestra, and was also a member of the Peter Herbolzheimer band. He is widely admired by trombonists and other musicians for his fluent and expressive playing, and has produced an extensive discography as a leader, including work with Bill Holman, Niels-Henning Ørsted Pedersen, Carl Fontana, and many others.

In more recent years, Whigham has been musical director of the RIAS Big Band in Berlin, Germany. He is formerly conductor of the BBC Big Band in Great Britain and currently co-director of the Berlin Jazz Orchestra with singer Marc Secara. He is featured on the Berlin Jazz Orchestra albums Update, You're Everything, Songs of Berlin, and music DVD (Polydor/Universal) Strangers in the Night - The Music of Bert Kaempfert. He was visiting tutor and artist at the Guildhall School of Music and Drama in London, the Royal Northern College of Music in Manchester and KUG in Graz, Austria. He is artist-in-residence for the Conn-Selmer company, maker of the King Jiggs Whigham model trombone. He continues to tour worldwide as a soloist, conductor, and educator. Since 2008 he has been a regular musical director for the Bundesjazzorchester working with the top student jazz musicians in Germany.

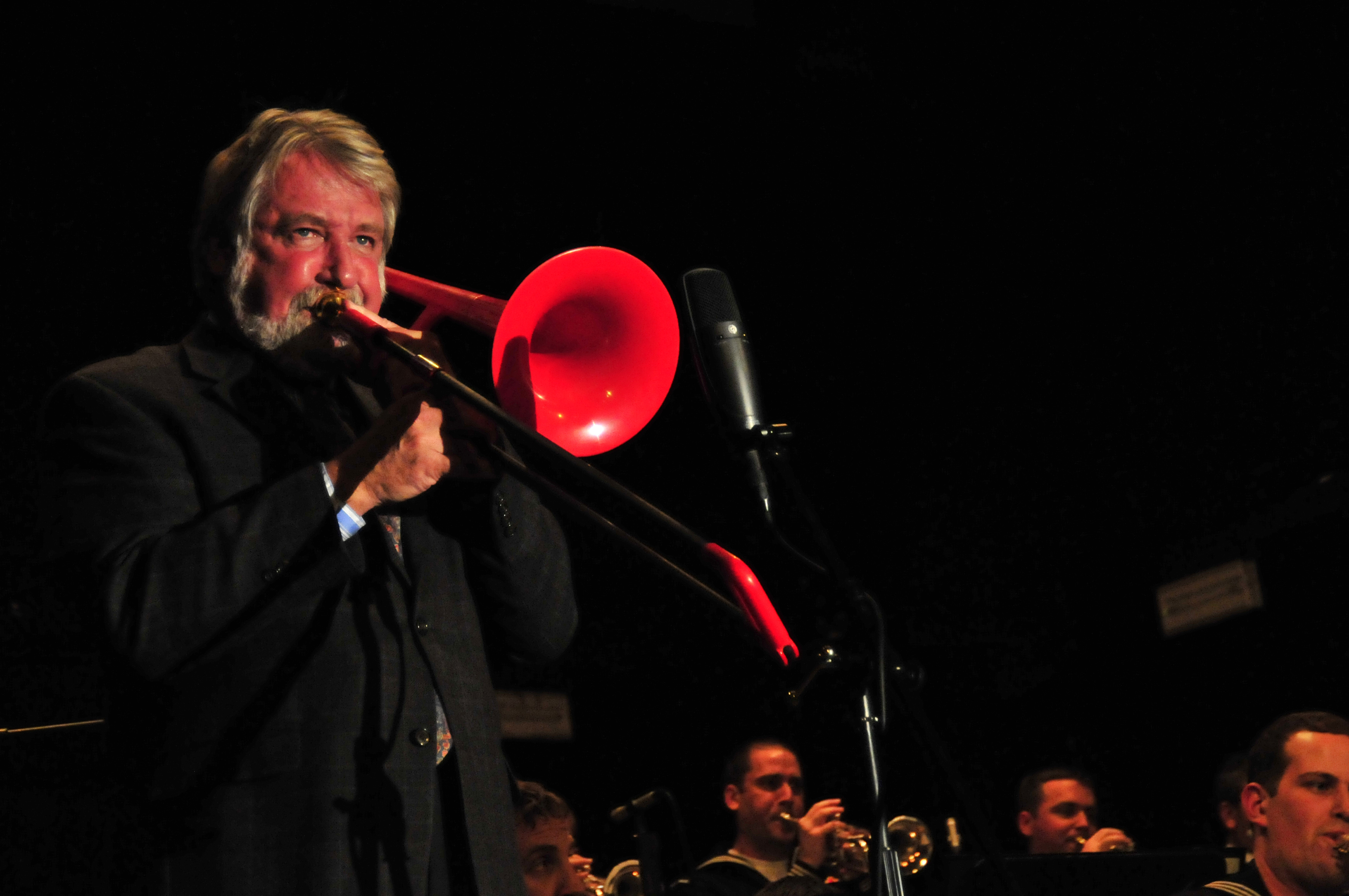
Jiggs Whigham with the U.S. Navy Band

He resides in Bonn-Bad Godesberg, Germany and Cape Cod, Massachusetts.

== Discography ==
- Values (MPS, 1971)
- The Jiggs Up (Capri, 1988)
- First Take (Mons, 1994)
- Hope (Mons, 1995)
- Jiggs & Gene (Azica, 1996)
- Blue Highway: The Music of Paul Ferguson (Azica, 1998)
- Jazz Meets Band (1999)
- The Heart & Soul of Hoagy Carmichael (TNC Jazz, 2002)
- Two-Too (Summit, 2006)
- Live at Nighttown: Not So Standards (Azica, 2015)

With the Berlin Jazz Orchestra

- 2004: Update
- 2007: You're Everything
- 2012: Strangers In Night - The Music Of Bert Kaempfert (DVD)
- 2021: Songs of Berlin
- 2022: Crosscurrents

With the hr-Bigband

- Strangers in the Night - The Music of Bert Kaempfert (Polydor, 2006)

=== As sideman ===
With Carl Fontana

- 1999: Nice 'n' Easy
- 2002: Keepin' up with the Boneses

With Peter Herbolzheimer

- 1973: Wide Open
- 2005: Toots Suite
- 2006: Getting Down to Brass Tracks

With Stan Kenton

- 1964: Artistry in Voices and Brass
- 1964: Stan Kenton presents Jean Turner
- 1998: Concert in England
- 2000: Live at Newport: 1959, 1963, 1971
- 2001: Back to Balboa: Tribute to Stan Keaton, Vol. 6
- 2003: At Brant Inn 1963

With Kenton Alumni Band

- 1992: 50th Anniversary Celebration: The Best of Back to Balboa
- 1995: 50th Anniversary Celebration: Back to Balboa
- 1995: 'Round Midnight Concert, Shades of Kenton Jazz Orchestra

With Paul Kuhn

- 2008: As Time Goes By
- 2013: Swing 85

With Bud Shank

- 1992: The Awakening
- 1995: Lost Cathedral

With others

- 1969: Harpadelic, Johnny Teupen
- 1970: Globe Unity 67 & 70, Globe Unity Orchestra
- 1971: Homecoming, Art Farmer
- 1972: ...Und..., Mladen Gutesha
- 1976: Kaempfert '76, Bert Kaempfert
- 1984: Lightnin', Klaus Weiss Big Band
- 1988: Barlach Zyklus, Mikesch Van Grummer
- 1992: Joe Pass in Hamburg, Joe Pass
- 1998: Meets the RIAS Big Band, Allen Farnham
- 2000: North Sea Jazz Sessions, Volume 2, Frank Rosolino
- 2005: Mosaic Select: Johnny Richards, Johnny Richards
- 2006: Tea Break/Back Again/Jazz from Two Sides, Vic Lewis
- 2007: Evergreens, Kurt Edelhagen
- 2007: Turnstile: The Music of the Trumpet Kings, Harry Allen
