= The United States Military Academy Band, West Point, New York (album) =

The United States Military Academy Band West Point, New York

Studio album by The U.S.M.A. Concert Band The Jazz Knights
- Released: 1993
- Recorded: 1991–1993, Band Building; 685 Hardee Place; West Point, New York
- Genres: Wind band, concert band, jazz, big band, instrumental
- Length: 57:52
- Label: Mark Records DC 1401
- Producers: LTC Frank G. Dubuy (U.S.M.A. Concert Band); SGM Ronald Seitz (The Jazz Knights)

The U.S.M.A. Concert Band The Jazz Knights chronology
Songs of the Civil War (1991)	The United States; Military Academy Band; West Point, New York (1993)	Jazz Knights: 25th Year (1997) (1998)
- cat. # MDC 1401

The United States Military Academy Band, West Point, New York is the first CD, digital format album released exclusively by the United States Military Academy Concert Band and Jazz Knights big band.

== Background ==
The West Point Band has officially been in existence since 1817

The West Point Band (USMA Band) has a tradition of musicians coming from professional groups and music schools such as the Juilliard School, Curtis Institute, University of North Texas, University of Indiana, Berklee College of Music, Eastman School of Music, and others. These musicians serve in the United States Army stationed at the United States Military Academy in a permanent duty "Special Bands" assignment and receive the immediate rank of NCO (E-6/ Staff Sergeant with special MOS). This U.S. Army unit has a tradition dating back to 1778; it is the U.S. Army's oldest active band and the oldest unit at the United States Military Academy. It was officially named The West Point Band in 1817.

The two groups recorded on the CD are entirely separate as concertizing units and having no crossover of musicians from ensemble to ensemble; this helps to retain a very high level of both ensembles' musicianship and expertise. They do combine into a marching band for Cadet reviews/activities and many other ceremonial military functions as per the unit's SOP. The Concert Band and the Jazz Knights have appeared in numerous high level military and patriotic ceremonies, public concerts, sporting events and radio and television broadcasts. They performed at the dedication of the Erie Canal, at the Chicago and New York World's Fairs, and for the funerals of Ulysses S. Grant and Franklin D. Roosevelt as well as the inaugurations and burials for numerous presidents. Additionally, the Concert Band and Jazz Knights have collaborated with some of the finest musical ensembles in the country, including the New York Philharmonic and the Boston Pops; they have also been showcased in Carnegie Hall and featured on The Today Show, 60 Minutes, Dateline NBC as well as on documentaries on the History and Discovery Channels. During the time of this CD recording, the concert band and marching band were featured on the Songs of the Civil War CD (for Columbia Records) and television program; 1991/1992 telecast on PBS. The band also played the military honors for President Richard Nixon's burial (New York stretch before flight to Yorba Linda, California). The Jazz Knights were featured on the A&E Network as part of the Boston Pops 4th of July Celebration during this time (for two years).

== About the music ==
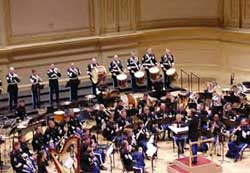
The U.S.M.A. (West Point) Concert Band performing at Carnegie Hall with the Hellcats on back row

When he assumed command in 1990, LTC Frank G. Dubuy wanted artistic documentation on a unique CD of the entire musical unit in terms of the two concertizing ensembles. One of the elements Dubuy saw lacking with the USMA Concert Band and Jazz Knights is the fact there was no good recording of the recent USMA groups (early 1990s). Dubuy met with the command staff about music to be recorded and picked the best possible works reflecting the present state of the groups and history embedded into the West Point Band music library and lineage.

The Concert Band recorded the opening and third movements of the Nelhýbel Concerto for Winds and Percussion as an important tribute to, and documentation of Václav Nelhýbel's close association to the West Point Band. Nelhýbel as well as Robert Russell Bennett, Morton Gould, Darius Milhaud, Percy Grainger, Henry Brandt and several other important wind band composers have written for the West Point Band over the last 150 years. The two Sousa works contrast the famous march style of the composer (Fairest of the Fair) against his programmatic music (Beneath the Southern Cross). The set of concert band recordings is rounded out with the Haydn Concerto for Oboe (Allegro Spiritoso) and the Peter Buys work Huntingdon Municipal Band March.

The entire set of eight charts the Jazz Knights recorded for these sessions were written and arranged by the three staff writers for the ensemble: Jim Perry, Jack Cooper and Paul Murtha (with an original tune by the guitarist Rob Helsel).

== Track listing ==
All tracks are written by various artists listed.

No.	Title	Length
1.	"The Fairest of the Fair (John Philip Sousa)"	3:40
2.	"Beneath The Southern Cross from Looking Upward (John Philip Sousa)"	5:30
3.	"Concerto for Oboe Allegro Spiritoso (Joseph Haydn, arr. Harvey Zorn)"	6:20
4.	"Concerto for Winds and Percussion (Václav Nelhýbel); Movement I, Allegro Maestoso"	3:50
5.	"Concerto for Winds and Percussion (Václav Nelhýbel); Movement III, Allegro"	2:59
6.	"Huntingdon Municipal Band March (Peter Buys)"	3:52
7.	"The Opener (Edmund L. Gruber, arr. Paul Murtha)"	3:23
8.	"Downward Mobility (Jim Perry)"	5:05
9.	"Old Folks (Willard Robison, arr. Jim Perry)"	5:20
10.	"'O Sole Mio (Eduardo di Capua, arr. Jim Perry)"	4:30
11.	"On, Brave Old Army Team (Philip Egner, arr. Jim Perry)"	2:05
12.	"Bells and Whistles (Rob Helsel, arr. Jack Cooper)"	5:30
13.	"Pensativa (Clare Fischer, arr. Jim Perry)"	5:20
14.	"Mr. Earl's Posh Pleasure Palace (Jack Cooper)"	4:00
Total length:		57:52

== Recording sessions ==
- Recorded and mixed: 1991–93 U.S.M.A. Band Building, West Point, New York

== Personnel ==
=== Musicians ===
==== The U.S.M.A. Concert Band ====
- Conductor (and commander of entire unit): LTC Frank G. Dubuy
- Flute: SFC Lynn Cunningham, SSG William Treat, SSG Julie Hill
- Oboe and English Horn: SGM Derek Brinkman, MSG Joel Evans
- E♭ Clarinet: SSG Rachel Grasso
- Clarinet: SGM James McKelvey, SFC Harold Easley, SFC Terence Rice, SSG Jeffrey Geller, SSG Barry Messer, SSG John Parrette, SSG Allan Plumb, SGT Chris Jones
- Bass Clarinet: SFC David Hydock, SFC Joseph Mariany
- Bassoon: MSG Kelvin Hill, SSG Christian Eberle
- Saxophone: MSG Joseph Foris, SFC Andrew Huson, SSG Gary McCourry, SSG Daniel Teare
- Cornet/trumpet: SGM John Sartoris, MSG William Connelly, MSG Michael Doyle, SFC Richard Storey, SSG Gregory Alley, SSG Robert Smither
- French Horn: MSG William Powell, SFC Joseph DeMers, SFC Dick Maxwell, SSG Harry Ditzel, SGT LaDonna Swetnam
- Trombone: MSG Steven Satone, SSG Gerard Amoury, SSG Jeffrey Slocum, SGT Martin Tyce
- Euphonium: SFC Joan Follis, SSG Barry Morrison
- Tuba: SFC Joseph Roccaro, SSG Gerald Cates, SSG Thomas Price, SGT John Reimund
- Percussion: SGM David Smith, SFC Andrew Csisack, SFC Warren Gallic, SSG Howard Potter, SSG Robert Ward

==== The Jazz Knights ====
- Conductor: CW2 Louis Letson
- Saxes and woodwinds: SFC Bryson Borgstedt, SSG Larry Wade, SFC Jim Perry, SSG Jack Cooper, SFC Greg Stegura
- Trumpets and flugelhorns: SSG Paul duBois, SFC Robert "Woody" Dotson, SFC Don Winslow, SGM Ron Seitz
- Trombones: SSG Doug Remine, SSG Harvey Tibbs, SGT James Way, SGT Matt Ingman
- Guitar: SSG Rob Helsel
- Piano: SFC Dave Horne
- Bass: SSG Lou Pappas
- Drums: MSG Ron Harsch
- Percussion: SFC Andy Cossack
- Vocalist: SGT Jeanette Hicks

=== Production ===
- Recording engineers: SGT Mark Ferguson and SGT Bruce Cain
- Mixing engineers: SGT Mark Ferguson and SGT Bruce Cain
- Production coordinator: SFC Joseph Roccaro
- Mastering: Mark Records
- Cover photo: file

== Print music from the CD ==
- Fairest of the Fair is published by C.L. Barnhouse Comp.
- Beneath The Southern Cross is published by C.L. Barnhouse Comp.
- Huntingdon Municipal Band March is published by C.L. Barnhouse Comp.
- Bells and Whistles is published by UNC Jazz Press
- Mr. Earl's Pleasure Palace is published by UNC Jazz Press

== See also ==
- West Point Band
- The Jazz Knights
- U.S. Army Special Bands
- United States Military Academy
