= Doug Lawrence (jazz musician) =

American saxophonist (born 1956)

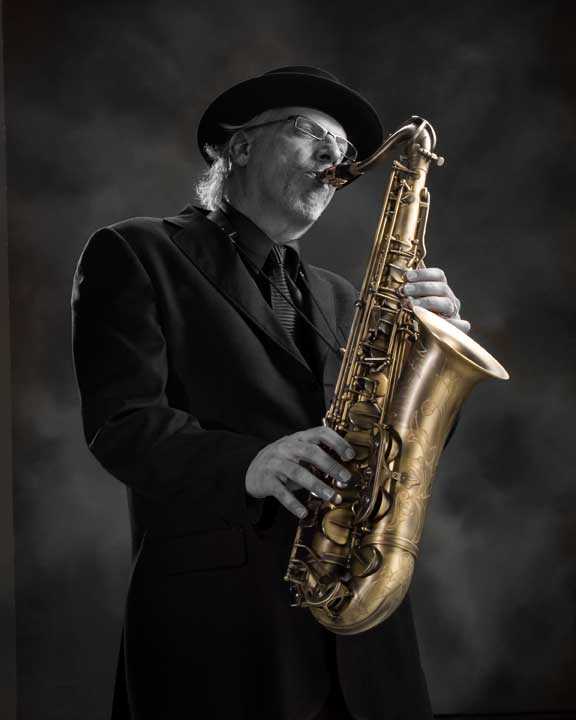
- Lawrence in 2006

Background information
- Born: October 11, 1956 (age 70); Lake Charles, Louisiana, U.S.
- Genre: Jazz
- Occupation: Musician
- Instrument: Tenor saxophone
- Years active: 1979–present
- Label: Cactus
- Website: douglawrenceofficial.com
- Military service
- Allegiance: United States
- Branch: United States Army
- Service years: 1978–1986
- Unit: USMA Band

Doug Lawrence (born October 11, 1956) is an American jazz tenor saxophonist from Lake Charles, Louisiana, United States.

== Early life ==
Lawrence, the youngest of six children, was born into a musical family in Lake Charles, Louisiana, and was raised in Albuquerque, New Mexico. His father and two of his older three brothers were professional musicians who had worked and recorded with Jack Teagarden, Elvis Presley, Ike & Tina Turner, Edgar Winter, The Righteous Brothers, Louie Bellson, and others, and both of his sisters played musical instruments. His mother was a dancer and played piano. Lawrence graduated from Highland High School in Albuquerque and studied music at North Texas State University and the University of New Mexico and he was a member of the Jazz Knights, a jazz ensemble of the West Point Band.

== Career ==
Lawrence spent more than 25 years in New York City, collaborating with Frank Sinatra, Tony Bennett, Aretha Franklin, Roy Eldridge, Nancy Wilson, Joe Williams, Teri Thornton, and Benny Goodman, among others. He has also recorded with many prominent jazz musicians such as Buck Clayton, Dizzy Gillespie, Ray Charles, Wild Bill Davis, Hank Jones, Mel Lewis, Frank Wess, Grover Mitchell, Loren Schoenberg, Butch Miles, and Jimmy Cobb, as well as recording six albums as a leader: Soul Carnival, High Heel Sneakers, Big Band Swing, Street Wise, Doug Lawrence New Organ Trio, and Doug Lawrence and Friends. Lawrence served in the West Point Band's Jazz Knights in the early 1980s as the lead tenor saxophonist.

Lawrence has been a featured performer at Carnegie Hall, the Kennedy Center, the Village Vanguard, the Walt Disney Concert Hall, and at the international concert halls and jazz festivals including the Sydney Opera House, the Moscow International House of Music, the Blue Note Tokyo, the Nice Jazz Festival, and the North Sea Jazz Festival. Since 1996, Lawrence has been, and is currently, the featured tenor saxophone soloist with the Count Basie Orchestra. In 2020, Lawrence began working in organist Joey DeFrancesco's band, Tenor Madness. After DeFrancesco's death in 2022, the band briefly continued on with Dan Trudell taking DeFrancesco's place on organ. This band featured longtime Harry Connick Jr., tenor saxophonist Jerry Weldon, and Lawrence in a quartet or quintet setting. Lawrence also works regularly with pianist George Cables. Lawrence leads his own 3–6 piece combo as well as a Latin jazz band called Doug Lawrence y Su Nuevo Mexicanos. Lawrence frequently appears as guest clinician and artist-in-residence at universities and jazz camps around the world. In November 2023, Lawrence was inducted into the New Mexico Music Hall of Fame, and on February 4, 2024, the Count Basie Orchestra won the Grammy Award for Best Large Jazz Ensemble Album, an album that features Lawrence on numerous tenor saxophone solos.

== Personal life ==
Lawrence lives in New Mexico, U.S. He has one daughter.

== Discography ==
Lawrence performing at The Outpost, Albuquerque, in 1998. From left: George Cables, Lawrence, John Webber, Leroy Williams

=== As leader ===
- Doug Lawrence Trio (DoLaDi Records, 1981)
- Soul Carnival (Fable/Lightyear/WEA, 1997)
- High Heel Sneakers (Fable/Lightyear/WEA ,1998)
- Big Band Swing (Black Orchid, 2001)
- Street Wise (AllTribe, 2002)
- Doug Lawrence New Organ Trio (Cactus, 2014)
- Doug Lawrence and Friends (Junkie Jazz, 2021)

=== As sideman ===
With Buck Clayton

- A Swingin' Dream (Stash, 1989)
- Live at the Village Vanguard (Nagel-Heyer, 1991)
- Swings The Village (Nagel-Heyer, 2002)
- New York Ballads (Nagel-Heyer, 2020)

With the Count Basie Orchestra

- Live in Japan (Sony, 2006)
- Singing, Swinging, Playing (Mack Avenue, 2009)
- A Very Swinging Basie Christmas (Concord, 2015)
- All About That Basie (Concord, 2018)
- Ella 100: Live At The Apollo (Concord, 2020)
- Live At Birdland (Candid, 2021)
- Late Night Basie (Primary Wave Music, 2023)
- The Count Basie Orchestra Swings The Blues (Candid, 2023)

With Grover Mitchell

- Truckin' (Stash, 1987)
- Live in Paris (Radio France, 1987)
- Hip Shakin' (Ken, 1990)

With Loren Shoenberg

- Just a Sittin' and a Rockin' (MusicMasters, 1990)
- Time Waits for No One (MusicMasters, 1992)
- Manhattan Work Song (MusicMasters, 1993)
- Out of This World (Montreux, 1998)

With others

- Jimmy Sturr, Jimmy Sturr Orchestra Polka Disco (RBS, 1979)
- James Chirillo, The Doug Lawrence Trio (DoLaDi, 1981)
- Teri Thornton, Good Morning Heartache (Monte Carlo, 1988)
- Wild Bill Davis Trio, Live At The West End (WKCR, 1990)
- Sammy Price, Two Tenor Boogie featuring Percy France and Doug Lawrence (WKCR, 1990)
- Jeff Jeroloman and George Cables, Swing Thing (Candid, 1993)
- Martha Lorin, The Time Is Now (Carmel, 1993)
- Ken Peplowski, A Good Reed (Concord, 1997)
- Cynthia Scott, I Just Want to Know (Itocs, 1998)
- Tony Corbiscello, In Full Swing (Allanna, 1999)
- Richard Allen, Gone with the Wind (JazzInn, 1999)
- Bobby Short, You're the Top (Telarc, 1999)
- New York Voices, Sing, Sing, Sing (Concord, 2000)
- Rosemary Clooney, Live At Ravinia (PBS/WTTW, 2001)
- George V. Johnson, Live at the JazzInn (JazzInn, 2001)
- Clyde Stubblefield, B3 Bombers Live at the Green Mill (AllTribe, 2002)
- Butch Miles, Straight On Till Morning (Nagel-Heyer, 2003)
- Nnenna Freelon, Blueprint of a Lady (Concord, 2005)
- Ray Charles, Ray Sings, Basie Swings (Concord, 2007)
- Tony Bennett, A Swingin' Christmas (Columbia, 2008)
- Jamie Cullum, The Pursuit (Verve, 2009)
- Hinton Battle, Meets the Count Basie Orchestra (Sony, 2013)
- John Trentacosta, Meets Doug Lawrence, Desert Bop (Cactus, 2019)
- Massamo Faraò, Body and Soul featuring Doug Lawrence (Azzura, 2023)
- Massamo Faraò, The Great Saxophone Jazz Lounge featuring Doug Lawrence and Jerry Weldon (Azzura, 2023)
- Isrea Butler, Congo Lament (Vegas, 2024)
- Dave Glasser, Two For The Road (Cactus, 2024)
- Debra Silver, Swinging Through The Holidays (Green Hill, 2024)
- Debra Silver, Basie Rocks (Green Hill, 2025)
