= The Jazz Knights =

American military jazz band

The Jazz Knights were a part of the U.S.M.A. Band from 1972 to 2015

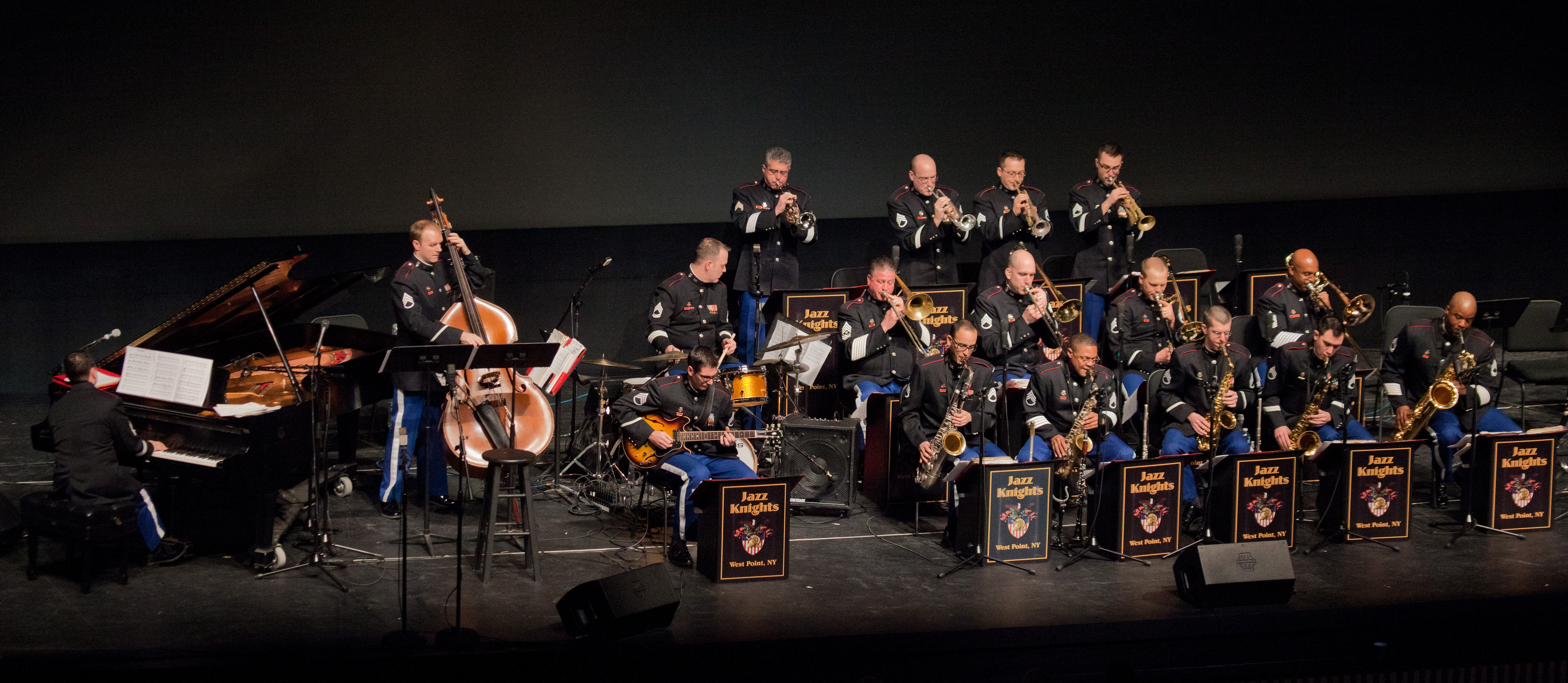
The Jazz Knights performing at Eisenhower Hall

The Jazz Knights was the jazz ensemble of the United States Military Academy Band stationed at West Point, New York; it was one of the premiere jazz ensembles of the United States Army Special Bands. Originally created in 1972, they carried the tradition of American Jazz and entertain the Corps of Cadets, the “JK's” were a professional big band rehearsing for the purpose of presenting jazz ensemble music. The ensemble's mission was to serve the United States Military Academy and the American public.

Eighteen professional musicians from across the United States were auditioned for the West Point Band to be a part of the unit through an exclusive audition process. Members of the band played, recorded, and toured with musicians like Count Basie, Buddy Rich, Woody Herman, Maynard Ferguson, Ahmad Jamal, Chaka Khan, Prince, Billy Cobham, the Tommy Dorsey and the Glenn Miller Orchestras, Emil Richards, David Liebman, Rufus Reid, John Clayton, Eddie Daniels, Steve Turre, Randy Brecker, Michael Abene, Jon Faddis, and Benny Golson.

Members of the group had graduated from different US-American universities such as the University of North Texas College of Music, Eastman School of Music, Indiana University, Berklee College of Music and the Manhattan School of Music. West Point Band band members were recruited and selected through an audition process specifically for service in the United States Military Academy Band at West Point. The Jazz Knights presented performances to audiences throughout the United States and Canada. The "JK's” routinely produced broadcasts and recordings that were heard in media outlets internationally. They performed at the Kennedy Center in Washington D.C. and for the A&E Network with the Boston Pops. Musicians/jazz artists who have served in the group over the years include Mike Burgess, James Cammack, James Chirillo, Alexis Cole, Jack Cooper, Paul DuBois, Matt Ingman, Vincent Herring, Dave Horne, Doug Lawrence, Ken McGee, Jim Perry, Harvey Tibbs, Greg Waits, and Jamie Way.

== Musical style ==
"Turning Points"
A 2013 performance by the Jazz Knights

The group covered music from Fletcher Henderson through Duke Ellington and Count Basie all the way through contemporary artists such as Bob Brookmeyer and Bill Holman. A large part of their music performed was written by their own staff writers and members of the Jazz Knights themselves.

== Discography ==
- U.S.M.A. Band, West Point, New York (1993)
- The Jazz Knights, 25th Year (1997)
- Emil Richards & the Jazz Knights (2000)
- West Point Band Bicenntennial Recording Project, Jazz Knights: Volume VI
- Two Centuries of American Music Tradition (2002)
- Jazz Knights "Commissions 2006" (2006)
- At First Light (2008)
- Turning Points (2010)

== Music education ==
An important part of the Jazz Knights mission was that of music/jazz education. Many of its members were accomplished clinicians with extensive backgrounds in music education. They performed at national music conventions including the International Association of Jazz Educators, Music Educators National Conference, the Midwest Clinic, the Western International Band Clinic, the University of Northern Colorado Jazz Festival, the International Society of Bassists' convention and the New York State Band Director's Association Conference in 1993 and 2008.

== See also ==
- United States Army Special Bands
- West Point Band
