= Václav Nelhýbel =

Czech-American composer (1919–1996)

- Born: September 24, 1919; Polanka nad Odrou, Ostrava, Czechoslovakia
- Died: March 22, 1996 (aged 76)
- Genre: Classical
- Occupation: Composer

Václav Nelhýbel (September 24, 1919 – March 22, 1996) was a Czech-American composer, mainly of works for student performers.

== Life and career ==
Nelhýbel was born the youngest of five children in Polanka nad Odrou, Ostrava, Czechoslovakia. He received his early musical training in Prague, going to both Charles University in Prague and Prague Conservatory. In 1942 he went to Switzerland, where he studied at University of Fribourg; after 1947 he taught there. In 1957 he came to the United States, where he taught at several schools, including Lowell State College. He served as composer-in-residence at University of Scranton for several years until his death. The university's Department of Performance Music continues to house his full collection of works.

Some of his music is for wind instruments or concert band, and most of his published music is designed for student performers. He used non-functional modal writing, pandiatonicism, and motor rhythms extensively.

He was an advocate of the use of a flute in F, sitting between (and notably aurally bridging) the standard (and far more common) C Flute and C Piccolo. Although such a flute is now commercially available from Kotato, he wrote of it in hypothetical terms as solving a perceived dilemma at the end of the chorale in his Symphonic Movement (1966); however, his advocating does not seem to have borne fruit. Interestingly, he advised against such a bridge role being served by either the E♭ soprano flute or G treble flute (at least in concert band settings) due to the additional accidentals (sharps and flats, respectively) compared to the key in which the flute/piccolo would be playing. His writing of the G treble flute in hypothetical terms, implies that he was unaware in 1967 of its recent creation and use by the Ulster Amateurs (a Northern Irish flute band) in 1965. That band used it as a replacement for the pre-Boehm (simple-system) flute in A♭. Those flutes served the same function as Nelhýbel's proposed F soprano flute – a bridge between piccolo and C flute.

Nelhýbel received numerous prizes and awards for his compositions, which include a prize at the International Music and Dance Festival in Copenhagen, Denmark, for his ballet "In the Shadow of the Limetree". In 1954, he was also awarded the first prize of the Ravitch Foundation in New York for his opera A Legend, and in 1978 he won an award from the Academy of Wind and Percussion Arts. Four American universities honored him with honorary doctoral degrees in music.

In addition to his works for winds, he wrote three ballets, three operas, and a symphony.

He was also a member of Phi Mu Alpha Sinfonia and Kappa Kappa Psi.

== Works ==
=== Orchestra ===
- 1964 Etude symphonique
- 1966 Passacaglia for orchestra and solo piano
- 1967 Dies ultima for orchestra, SATB chorus, SATB soli, narrator, speaking chorus and jazz band
- 1967 Music for Orchestra
- 1968 Movement for Orchestra
- 1972 A mighty fortress
- 1973 Polyphonies
- 1974 Aegean Modes
- 1976 Finale
- 1977 Concerto spirituoso No. 4 for orchestra, string quartet and solo voice
- 1976 Slavonic Triptych
- 1979 Lincoln Scene
- 1980 Six Fables for all time for orchestra, SATB chorus and narrator
- 1981 Overture for Orchestra
- 1985 New Orleans Concerto
- Cantique des cantiques for orchestra, soprano solo, harp and piano
- Cantus Concertante for orchestra, violin, viola, cello soli and soprano solo
- Canzona e Toccata feroce
- Christmas in Bohemia for mixed choir and orchestra
- Concerto spirituoso No. 5 for orchestra, saxophone quartet and string quartet
- Concerto for clarinet and orchestra
- Concerto for double bass and orchestra
- Concerto for guitar and chamber orchestra
- Concerto for trombone and orchestra
- Concerto for viola and orchestra
- Concertino for chamber orchestra and piano
- Divertimento for brass quintet and orchestra
- Fantasia Concertante
- Fantasy on America for festival orchestra, solo violin and youth solo section
- Four Australian Songs for orchestra and (SA) chorus
- Four readings from Marlowe's "Doctor Faustus" for orchestra (or piano) and male solo voice
- Graffiti Pompeiani for orchestra, SSATTBB soli and piano
- Houston Concerto
- Jesu meine Freude
- Kindermarch
- Let there be Music for orchestra, SATB chorus, baritone voice solo, piano, bass guitar and electric guitar
- Music for Woodwind Quintet and Orchestra
- Praise the Lord for orchestra, SATB chorus, SATB soli and piano
- Rhapsody for saxophone and orchestra
- Rhapsody in D for orchestra, string quartet and piano
- Sine Nomine for SATB chorus, SATB soloists, orchestra and band
- Sinfonie contra Plagam for orchestra and SATB chorus
- Sinfonietta Concertante
- Three Modes for Orchestra for orchestra and piano
- Two Movements for Chamber Orchestra

=== Concert band ===
- 1965 Chorale
- 1965 Symphonic Requiem for band and bass baritone solo
- 1965 Trittico
  1. Allegro maestoso
  2. Adagio
  3. Allegro marcato
- 1966 Adagio and Allegro
- 1966 Andante and Toccata
- 1966 Appassionato
- 1966 Estampie for band and antiphonal brass choir (2 trumpets, 2 trombones)
- 1966 Prelude and Fugue
- 1966 Symphonic Movement
- 1967 Caucasian Passacaglia
- 1967 Ceremonial Music for field band and antiphonal trumpet
- 1967 Suite Concertante
- 1967 Three Revolutionary Marches (composed by Smetana, arranged by Nehlýbel)
- 1968 Festivo
- 1969 Marcia Dorica
- 1969 Suite from Bohemia
- 1970 Two Symphonic Movements
- 1970 Cantata Pacis SATB chorus, SATB soloists, wind ensemble, piano-celesta, organ and percussion
- 1971 Yamaha Concerto
- 1971 Hymn of Hope for band and SATB chorus
- 1972 Alaska Scherzo
- 1972 Antiphonale for band, brass sextet (3 trumpets, 3 trombones)
- 1972 High Plains
- 1972 Introit for band and chimes solo
- 1973 Concert Piece for band, solo wind instrument (alto or tenor or baritone saxophone, or trumpet, or trombone, or baritone, or tuba)
- 1973 Organum for band and antiphonal brass choir (2 trumpets, 2 trombones)
- 1974 Czech Suite
- 1974 Dixie Parade
- 1974 Halleluiah for band and SATB chorus
- 1974 Russian Chant and Dance
- 1975 Fugue to the Mountains
- 1975 Praise to the Lord for band and antiphonal trumpets
- 1976 Ballad
- 1976 Ça Ira (song of the French Revolution)
- 1976 Corsican Litany
- 1976 Crusaders
- 1976 Dialogues for band and piano solo
- 1976 Evening Song
- 1976 Fanfares (Smetana-Nelhybel)
- 1976 Finale based on "When Johnny Comes Marching Home", "Glory, Glory Hallelujah" and "America"
- 1976 March in Counterpoint
- 1976 March to Nowhere
- 1976 Parade
- 1976 Processional
- 1976 Religioso
- 1976 Valse Nostalgique
- 1977 Aegean Modes
- 1977 Lyrical March
- 1977 Yugoslav Dance
- 1979 Amen
- 1979 Ritual
- 1980 Battle Hymn of the Republic for band and SATB chorus
- 1981 Concerto Grosso for band and tubas solo (2 or more tubas)
- 1981 He's got the whole World in his Hands for band and SATB chorus
- 1981 Swing low, Sweet Chariot for band and SATB chorus
- 1982 Concertante
- 1982 Fantasia, three interpretations of Prelude I from Johann Sebastian Bach's Well-Tempered Clavier
- 1982 French Suite
- 1982 Holiday in Germany
- 1983 Born to die
- 1983 Christmas in Poland
- 1983 Great is thy Faithfulness (Runyan-Nelhybel) for band and SATB chorus
- 1984 Agon
- 1985 Overture for Band
- 1988 Christmas March
- 1988 Festove Adorations based on "A Mighty Fortress", "Jesu Priceless Treasure", and "Praise the Almighty"
- 1989 Cantus
- 1990 Concerto for bass trombone and wind ensemble or orchestra
- 1992 Procession to the End of Time
- 1995 Concertato for tenor trombone, bass trombone and wind ensemble
- 1996 Concerto for euphonium and band
- 1996 Prelude and Chorale for band and solo instrument – based on the 12th century chorale Svaty Vaclave
- 1996 Prayer and Thanksgiving
- 1996 Songs of Praise based on "God of our Fathers", "Holy, Holy, Holy", "Onward Christian Soldiers"
- 1996 Star Spangled Banner
- Agape for soloists, SATB chorus and wind ensemble
- Agitato e Marcia
- Amen for Everyman for SATB chorus, SB soloists, band, jazz ensemble and organ
- America sings for SATB chorus and band
- Benny Havens
- Canticum for band and SATB chorus
- Ceremony for Band
- Chorale Variations
- Chronos for band, guitar and piano
  1. Grave – Adagio
  2. Toccata feroce
- Concerto for clarinet (or saxophone), 25 winds, percussion
- Concerto for horn (or tuba), piccolo, 2 flutes, oboe, english horn, 2 bassoons, 2 clarinets, harp, double bass, 2 trumpets, trombone, vibraphone, xylophone, bells, chimes
- Cornerstone for a new Moon for SATB, band, piano and organ
- Dance of the dead Souls
- De Profundis concerto for trumpet and band
- Divertimento for Band
- Drake Suite
- Epitaph
- Espressivo
- Five and a half Songs for SATB chorus, TB soloists, 12 woodwinds, 5 brass, 2 percussion and keyboard
- Golden Concerto for trumpet, 16 winds and percussion
- Hymn of hope for (SATB) chorus and band
- Jesu, Priceless Treasure (Bach-Nelhybel) for band and SATB chorus
- La danse des fauves for clarinet, oboe/english horn, bassoon and band
- Lento for Band
- Liturgy for band and solo voice
- Monolith
- Musical Offering (Bach-Nelhybel) based on three chorales by Johann Sebastian Bach: "Jesu Priceless Treasure", "Morning Star", "Oh Sacred Head Now Wounded"
- Ostinato
- Pentecost Concerto for clarinet and band
- Rhapsody in C for band and piano solo
- Sand-Silence-Solitude
- Sine Nomine for SATB chorus, SATB Soloists, orchestra and band
- Sinfonia Resurrectionis
- The Silence for band and soprano solo
- Te Deum SATB chorus, SATB soloists, organ or 3 trumpets, 3 trombones, tuba and timpani
- Toccata (Cernohorsky-Nelhýbel) for band and organ – An arrangement of a toccata by Bohuslav Matej Cernohorsky (1684–1742)
- Toccata feroce for band and piano solo
- Toccata in D
- Toccata in D (Flat)
- Toccata in E
- Variations on "Es ist genug"

=== Organ ===
- Concerto No. 1 for organ and orchestra without woodwinds
- Concerto No. 2 for organ and orchestra without woodwinds
- Concerto No. 3 for organ, piccolo trumpet and timpani
- Introit for organ and solo chimes

=== Choral ===
- 1966 Caroli Antiqui Varii SSATTBB chorus – 7 traditional Christmas songs
  1. Quem vidistis
  2. Lully lulla
  3. Qui creavit caelum
  4. Celebrons
  5. O Jesu Christ
  6. Es kommt ein Schiff geladen
  7. Puer natus in Bethlehem
- 1966 Epitaph for a Soldier SATB chorus and SA soloists – text by Walt Whitman from Leaves of Grass
- 1966 The Wife of Usher's Well SATB chorus
- 1967 Four Ballads – (The Gallows-Tree) SSATBB chorus and SBB soloists
  - "Come, O My Love" TBB chorus
  - "Peter Gray" SSA chorus
  - "The Devil and the Farmer's Wife" SSATBB chorus
- 1971 Let my People go SATB Chorus and SATB Soloists
- 1972 The Lord shall raise me up SATB Chorus
- 1973 Gift of Love SA Chorus
- 1975 Estampie Natalis for eight-part mixed chorus, SAT soli, piccolo, violin (viola), cello, and percussion
- 1977 Psalm 150 (Praise Him with the Timbrel) Four-Part Chorus of Mixed Voices
- 1979 Adoratio 6 sopranos, 5 altos, 5 tenors, 5 basses (or larger chorus) – text from the second book of Solomon's Song of Songs
- 1980 Orange and blue SATB Chorus
- 1981 All through the Night SSA Chorus
- 1981 Katy Cruel SSA Chorus
- Banana Three and other Songs SATB Chorus

=== Opera ===
- 1954 A Legend
- 1979 Everyman – based on a medieval ballad
- King Lear – text: William Shakespeare's King Lear
- The Station

== Selected discography ==
- The Symphony Orchestra and Its Instruments (1959)
- Twelve-Tone Composition Prepared by Vaclav Nelhybel (1961)
- Forms in Instrumental Music: Prepared by Vaclav Nelhybel (1962)
- Modal Counterpoint in the Style of the 16th Century Prepared by Vaclav Nelhybel (1962)
- Music Arrangement: Prepared by Vaclav Nelhybel – Musical examples played by chamber orchestra (1962)
- Traditional Harmony Prepared by Vaclav Nelhybel (1962)
- The Fugue in the Style of the 18th Century (1964)
- Tonal Counterpoint in the Style of the 18th Century Prepared by Vaclav Nelhybel (1964)
- Outer Space: Music by Vaclav Nelhybel (1974)
