= Polanka nad Odrou =

Borough of Ostrava, Czech Republic

- Borough of Ostrava
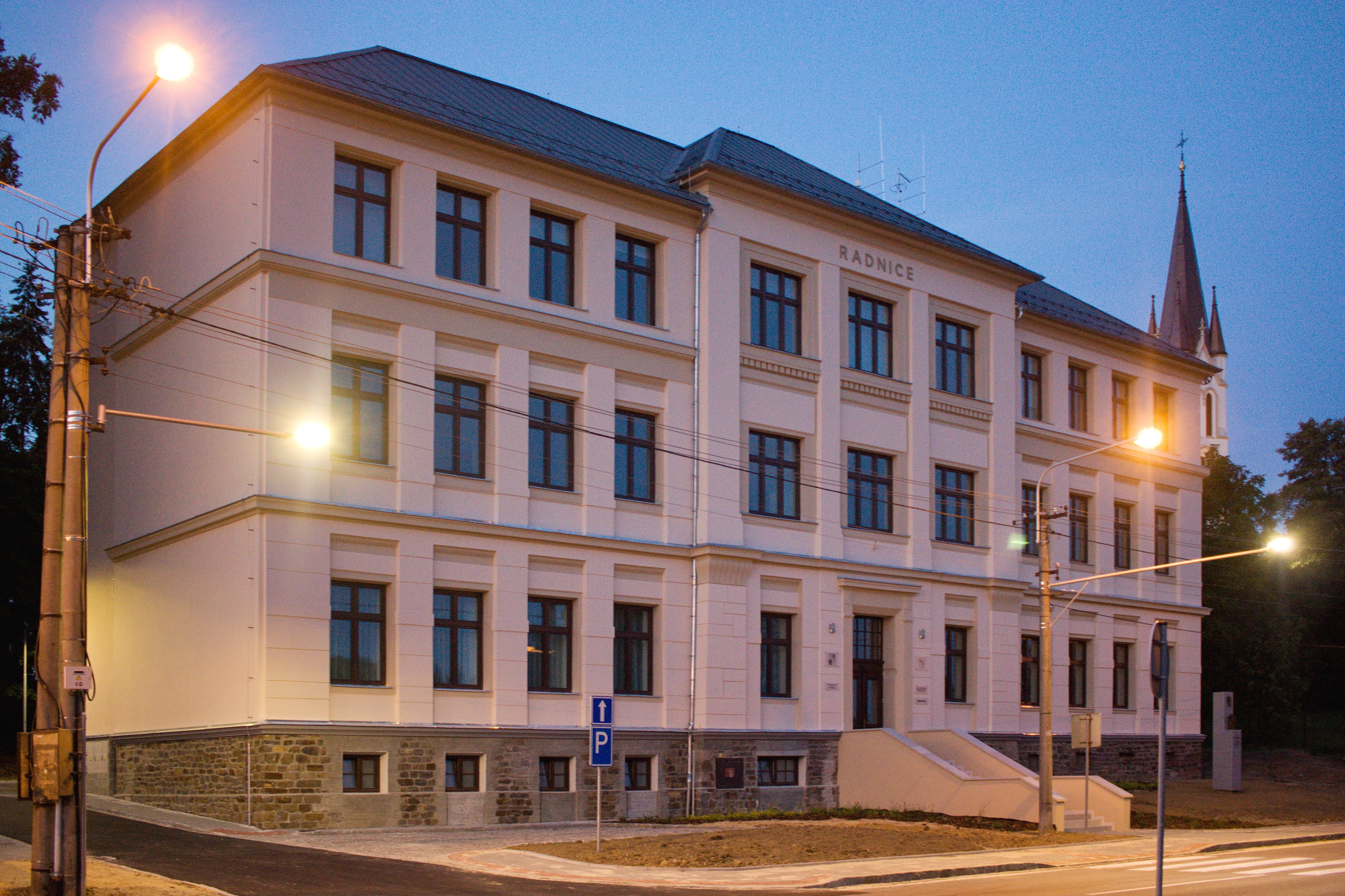
- Municipality district office

- Flag Coat of arms

- Location of Polanka nad Odrou in Ostrava
- Coordinates: 49°47′15″N 18°9′44″E
- Country: Czech Republic
- Region: Moravian-Silesian
- Municipality: Ostrava

Area
  - Total: 17.25 km^{2} (6.66 sq mi)

Population (2021)
  - Total: 1,504
  - Density: 87.19/km^{2} (225.8/sq mi)
- Time zone: UTC+1 (CET)
  - Summer (DST): UTC+2 (CEST)
- Postal code: 725 25
- Website: polanka.ostrava.cz

Polanka nad Odrou is a borough and municipal part of the city of Ostrava, Czech Republic. It is situated in the southwestern part of the city on the left bank of the Oder River. Originally a separate municipality, it was incorporated into Ostrava in 1976, as a part of the borough Poruba. On 24 November 1990, it separated from Poruba and became one of the 23 self-governing boroughs of Ostrava.

== Etymology ==
The word polanka is the diminutive form of polana, which is an Old Czech word for a deforested area transformed into a field. The suffix nad Odrou translates as 'above the Oder River', which is referencing to the area's location.

== Gallery ==
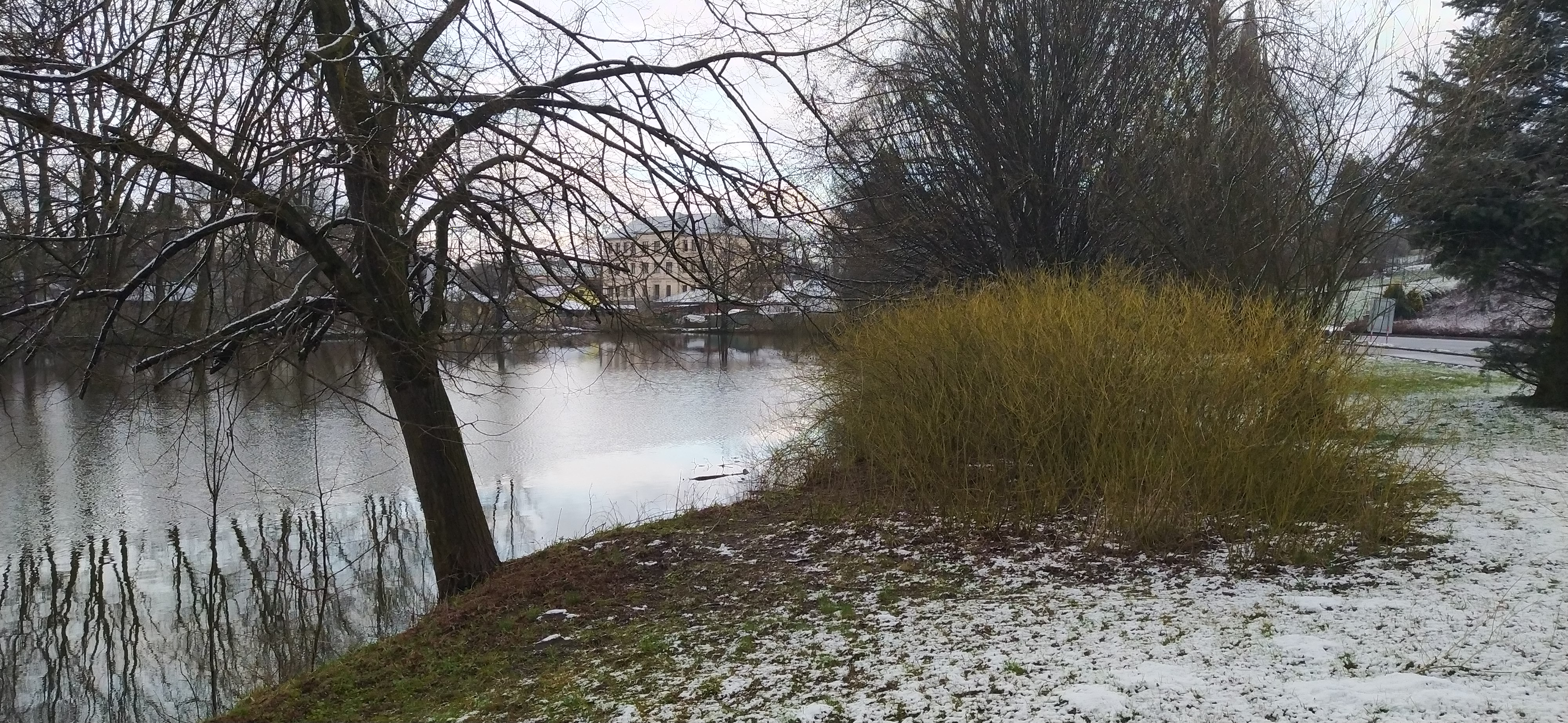
Fishpond Pod zámkem

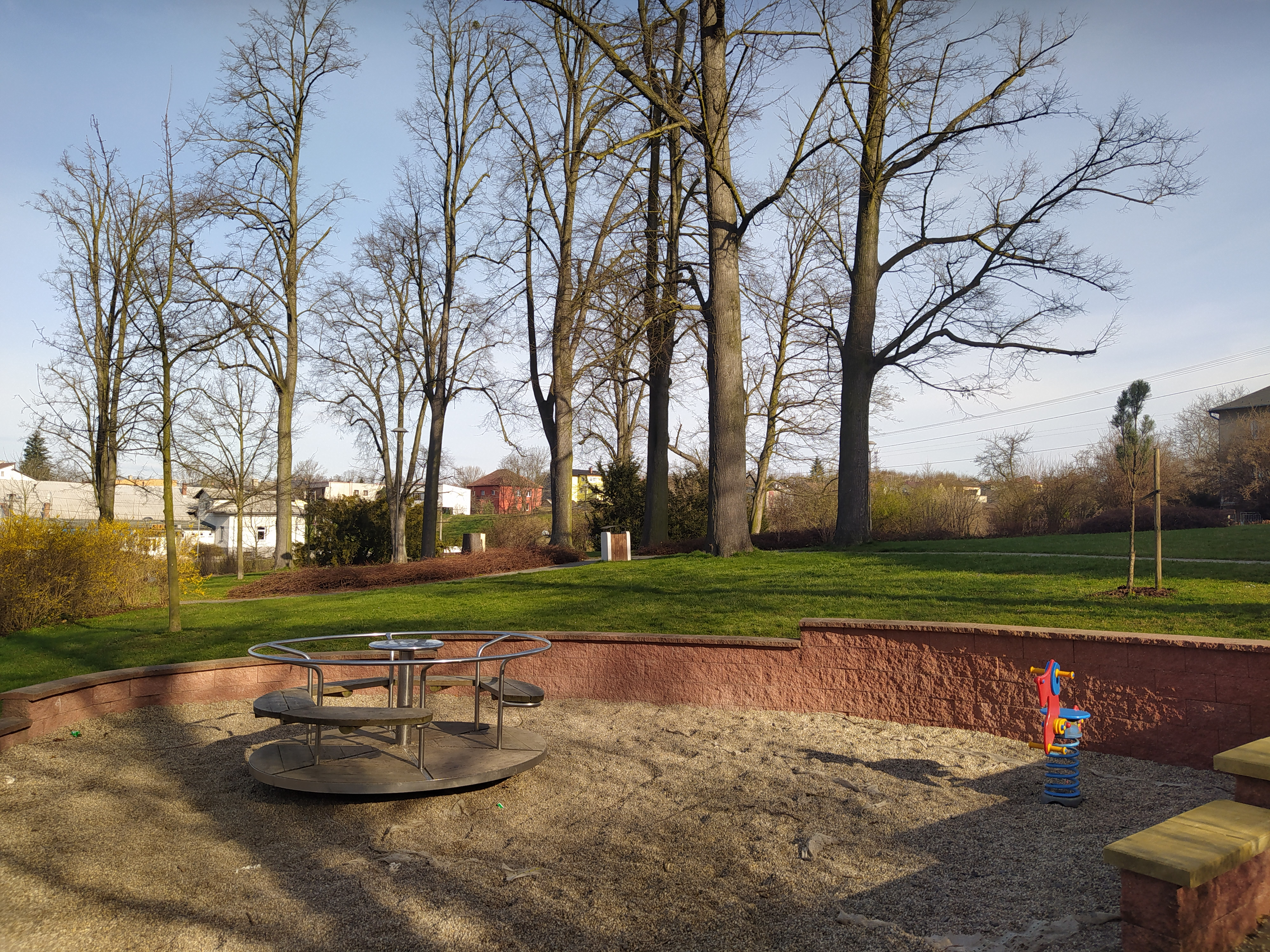
Park

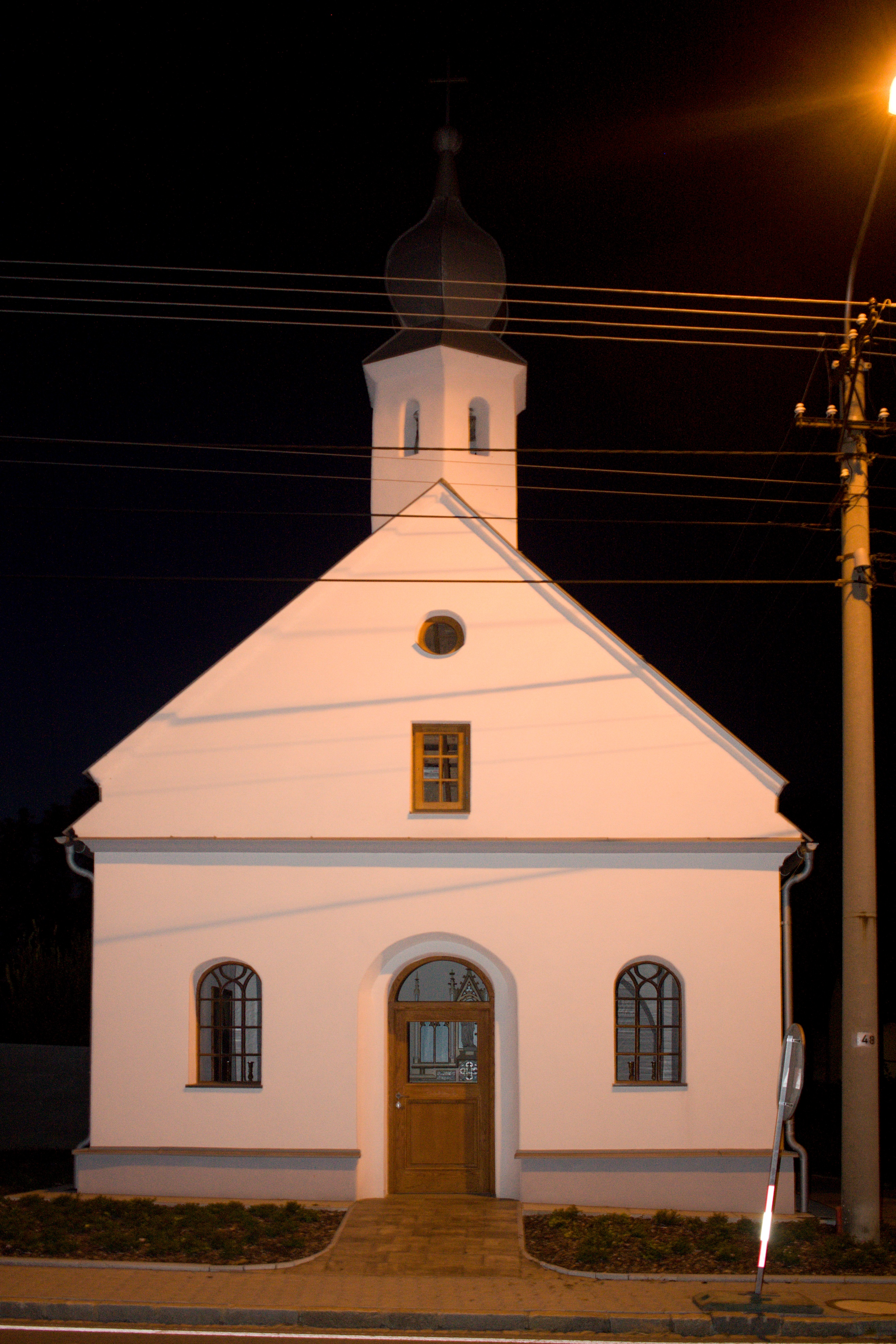
Chapel
