= West Point Band =

United States Military Academy Band
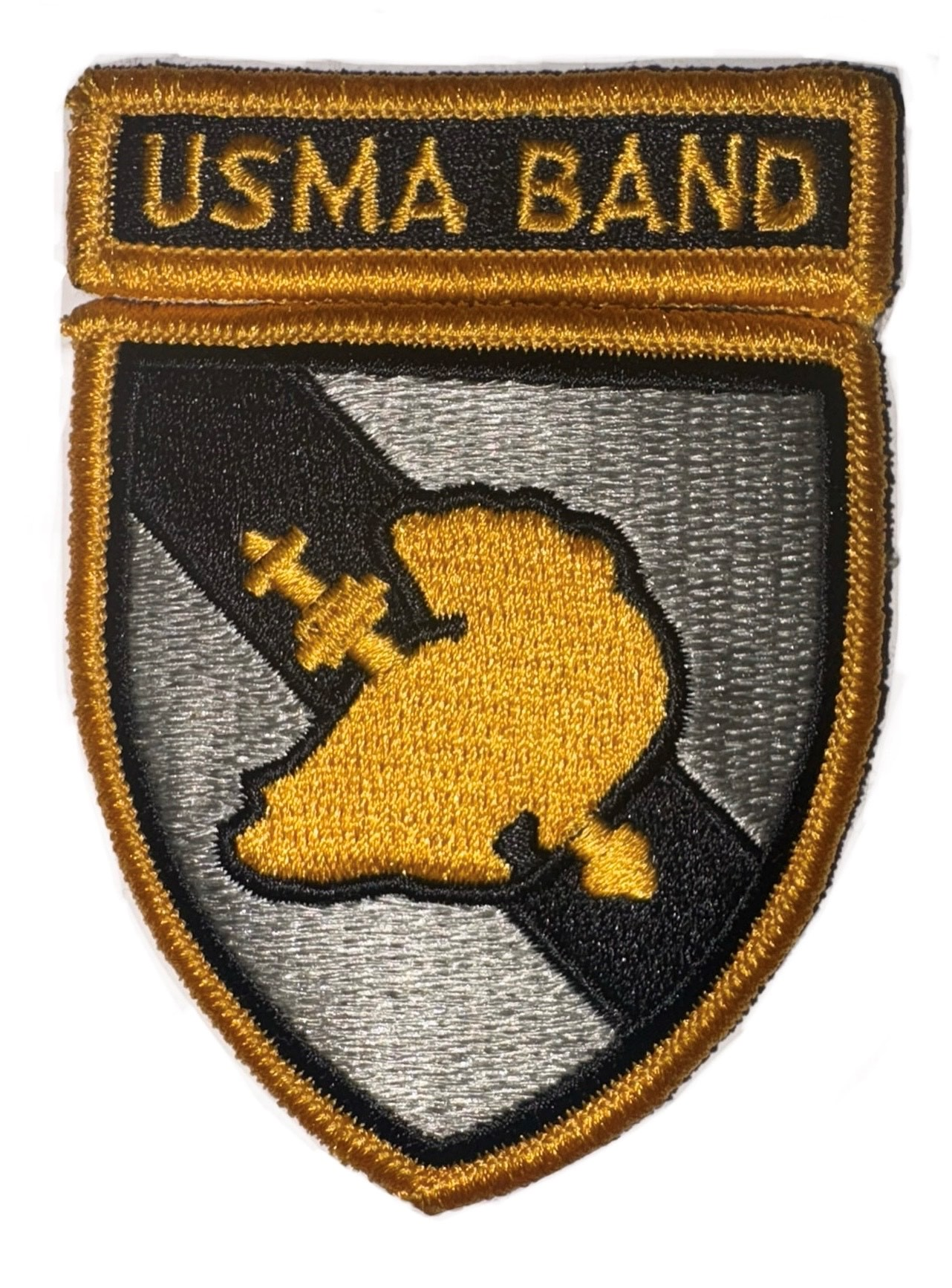
- United States Military Academy Band; Shoulder Sleeve Insignia
- Founded: 1817
- Country: United States
- Branch: United States Army
- Garrison/HQ: West Point, New York
- Nickname: "West Point Band"
- Colors: Black and White
- March: The Army Goes Rolling Along (Official Song)
- Website: westpointband.com

Commanders
- Commander and Conductor: LTC Dae Kim
- Deputy Commander: CPT Phil Tappan
- Command Sergeant Major: CSM Scott Drewes
- Notable commanders: Philip Egner; Richard Willis

Insignia
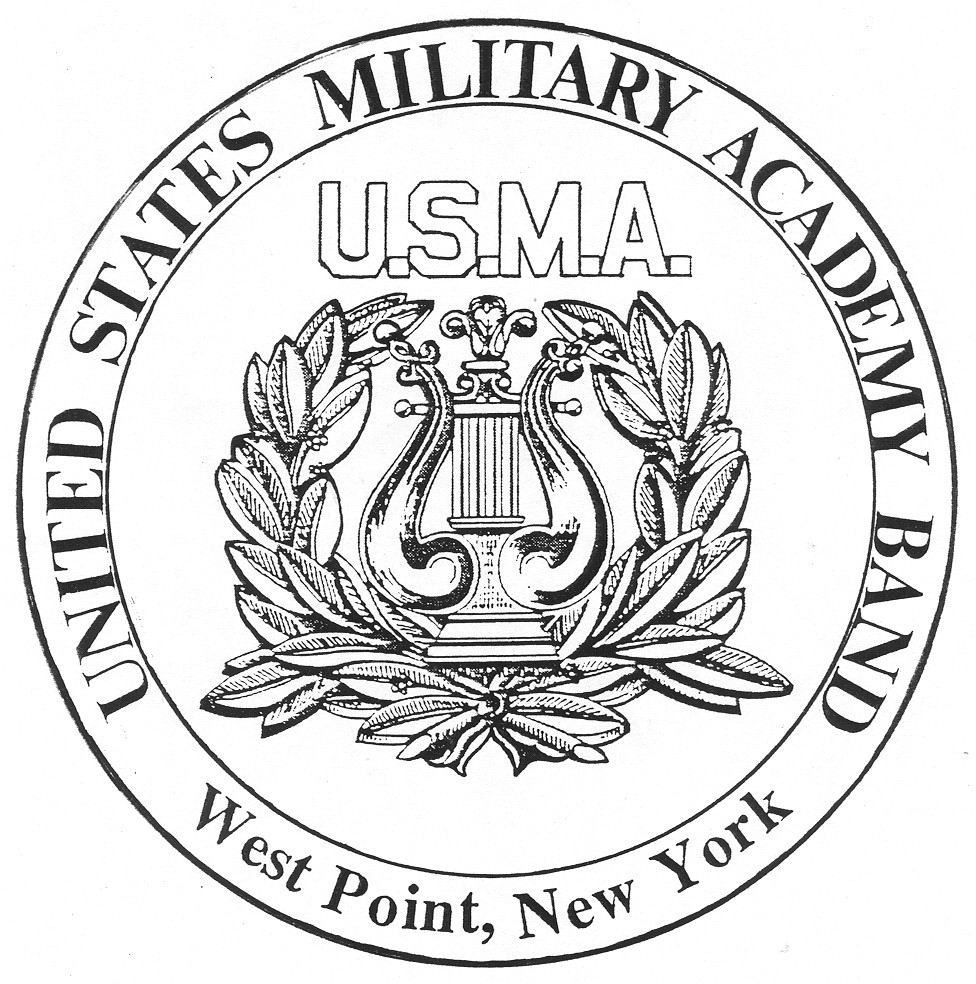
- USMA Band Crest

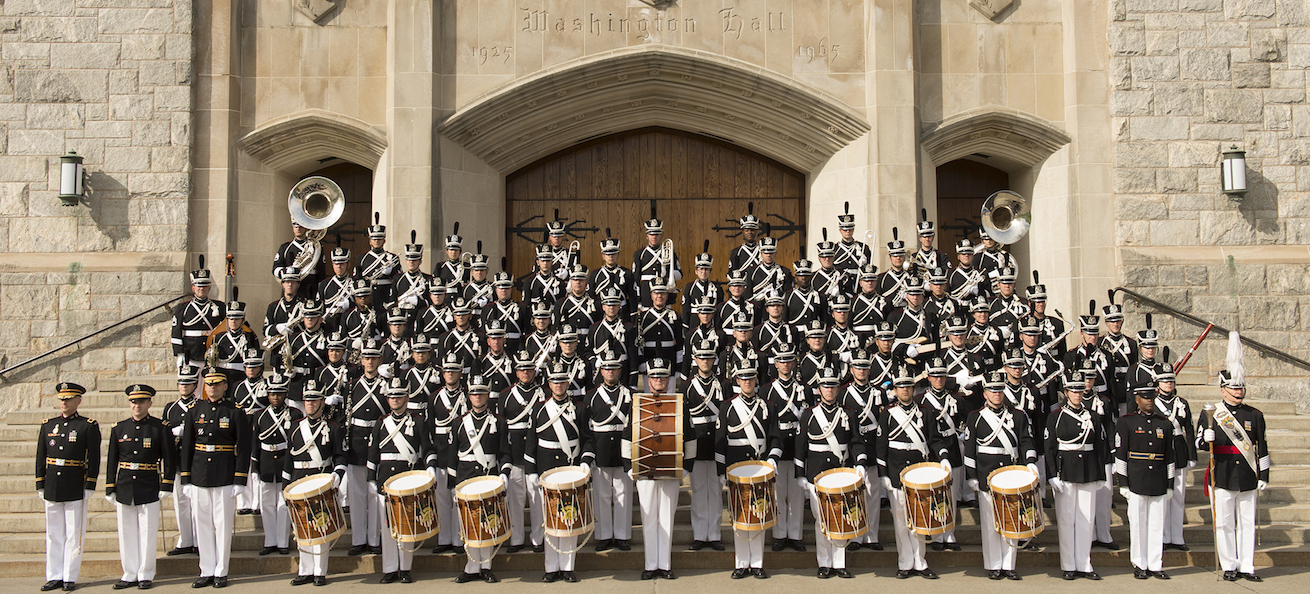
West Point Band stands in front of Washington Hall. West Point, NY. 2017

The West Point Band (also known as the U.S. Military Academy Band or USMA Band) is the U.S. Army's oldest active-duty band and the oldest unit at the United States Military Academy. An act of Congress (Military Peace Establishment Act) issued on March 16, 1802 directed that a corps of engineers be established and stationed at West Point which would constitute a Military Academy. This act formed the Regiment of Artillerist which included four military musicians, the first officially assigned musicians to the United States Military Academy. The band as a unit received its official authorization from the Department of War on June 16, 1817.

== Unit organization ==
Four official ensembles make up the West Point Band: The Ceremonial Concert Band, the "Hellcats" or field music group, the West Point Brass Quintet, and the "Benny Havens Band" or popular music group. These ensembles fulfill all of the official musical requirements of the United States Military Academy including military ceremonies, public concerts, sporting events, radio/television broadcasts, and Corps of Cadets activities.

== Notable appearances ==
As the senior premier musical representative of the United States Army, the band has appeared at many historical events. It performed for the farewell visit of General Lafayette; the dedication of the Erie Canal; the St. Louis, Chicago and New York World's Fairs; the Macy's Thanksgiving Day parade in 1970 and 2016; for the funerals of Ulysses S. Grant, Franklin D. Roosevelt, and Richard M. Nixon; and the inaugurations of numerous presidents.

The West Point Band serves as the official band of the Belmont Stakes.

Additionally, the West Point Band has collaborated with some of the finest musical ensembles in the country, including the New York Philharmonic, the Boston Pops, and the Mormon Tabernacle Choir. Members of the West Point Band have been showcased at Carnegie Hall and featured on the Today Show, 60 Minutes, Dateline NBC, The History Channel, Discovery Channel, and recordings with Columbia Records.

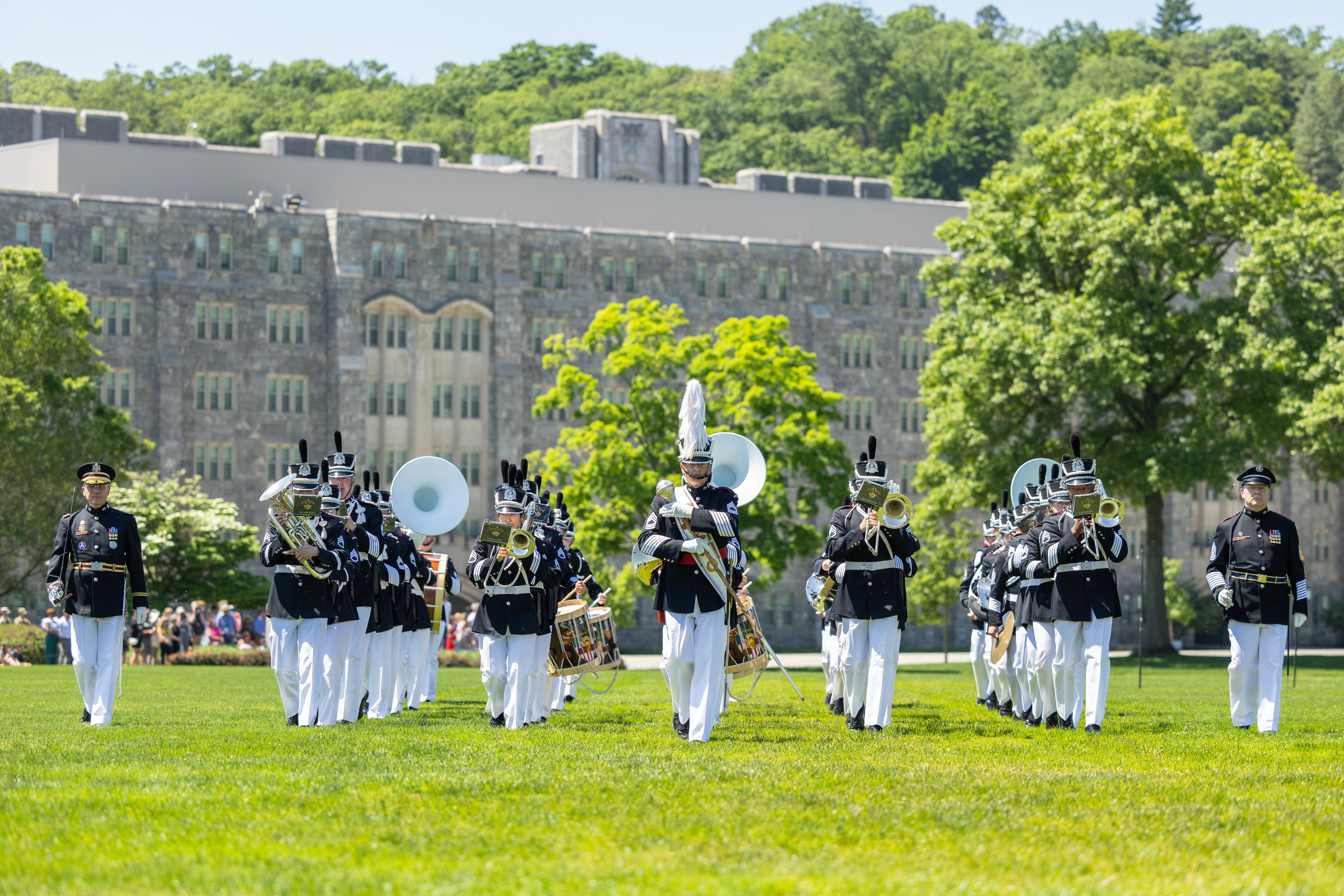
USMA Band marching at the 2024 West Point Graduation Day Parade.

=== Inaugural parades ===
The West Point Band has been a part of 18 inaugural parades, a tradition that began in 1873 with President Ulysses S. Grant, a West Point graduate (Class of 1843).

Year	President	Photograph
1872	Ulysses S. Grant	
1891	James A. Garfield	
1905	Theodore Roosevelt Jr.	
1909	William H. Taft	
1917	Woodrow Wilson	
1921	Warren G. Harding	
1937	Franklin D. Roosevelt	
1949	Harry S. Truman	
1953, 1957	Dwight D. Eisenhower	
1961	John F. Kennedy	
1965	Lyndon B. Johnson	
1969, 1973	Richard M. Nixon	
1977	Jimmy E. Carter	
1981	Ronald W. Reagan	
1989	George H.W. Bush	
1993, 1997	William J. Clinton	
2001, 2005	George W. Bush	

== History ==
=== Early beginnings: 1778–1802 ===
While commanding the Continental Army during the American Revolution, George Washington wrote to his officers:

The music of the army being in general very bad; it is expected, that the drum and fife Majors exert themselves to improve it, or they will be reduced, and their extraordinary pay taken from them: Stated hours to be assigned, for all the drums and fifes, of each regiment, to attend them, and practice—Nothing is more agreeable, and ornamental, than good music; every officer, for the credit of his corps, should take care to provide it.

— George Washington, "General Orders", 4 June 1777

The West Point Band can trace its roots back to when fifers and drummers were stationed within companies of Continental Soldiers on Constitution Island, just across the Hudson River from West Point. In 1778, shortly after these words by Washington, Brigadier General Samuel Holden Parsons and his brigade crossed the icy Hudson River and climbed onto The Plain at West Point. Since that day, West Point has been occupied by the United States Army, and soldier musicians have been ever present.

=== Formative years: 1802–1815 ===
With the establishment of the United States Military Academy in 1802 came an increased demand for military music. As the academy grew, it needed fifers, drummers and buglers to drill the cadets and regulate their daily duties. On April 15, 1802, Jonathan Williams the first Superintendent of the United States military academy set down his desire to have a professional band at West Point with two Teachers of Music (TM) of the enlisted rank.

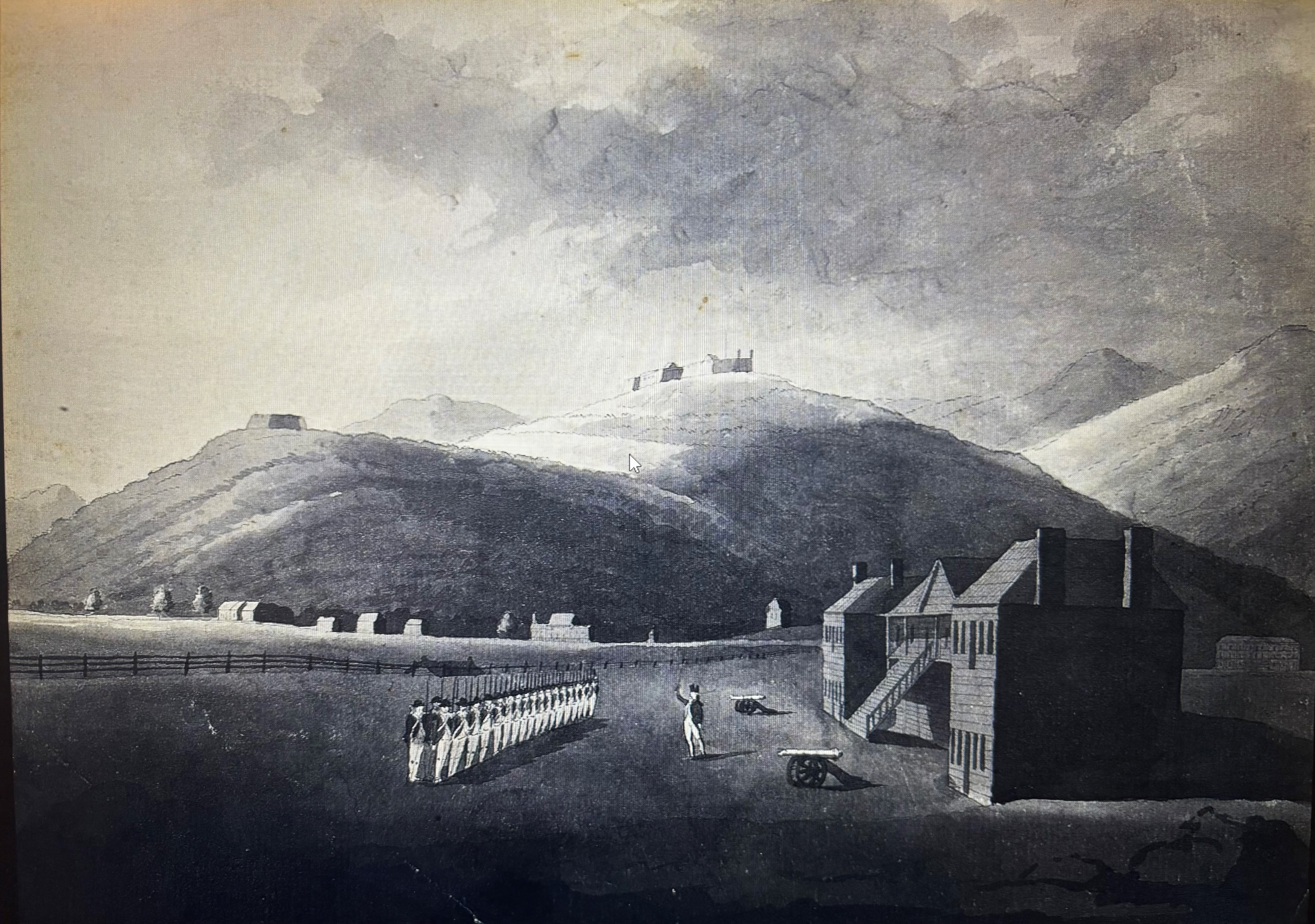
West Point. Painted in 1800 by an unknown artist. (Source: West Point Museum, Art Collection)

Music at West Point began with two attached musicians to do the various formations which required musical support. Musician Francis Masi (promoted to the first Teacher of Music) and his brother Vincent Masi were the first documented Field Musicians assigned to the Military Academy, being hired on February 28, 1803, in accordance with an Act of Congress.

By 1809, young men of enlistment age were being recruited or transferred to West Point as musicians. John Babbitt, a fifer, had been Company Fife Major at the 6th Infantry Band School on Governor's Island and was most likely a full-time soldier/musician transferred to West Point. With the beginning of the War of 1812, West Point's role as a professional military school would solidify further, and the need for a professional band become essential for military drill and training. To that end, Captain Alden Partridge's Company of Vermont Militia from Norwich, Vermont formed the core of The Company of Bombardiers, Sappers, and Miners at West Point by an Act of Congress on April 29, 1812. Among them, four musicians were listed: Joseph Roberts, Eleazar Smith, Joab Young, and Silas A. Robinson (West Point's first known Drum Major). These soldiers were the first example of a complete West Point band of martial music.

=== Official beginnings: 1815–1819 ===
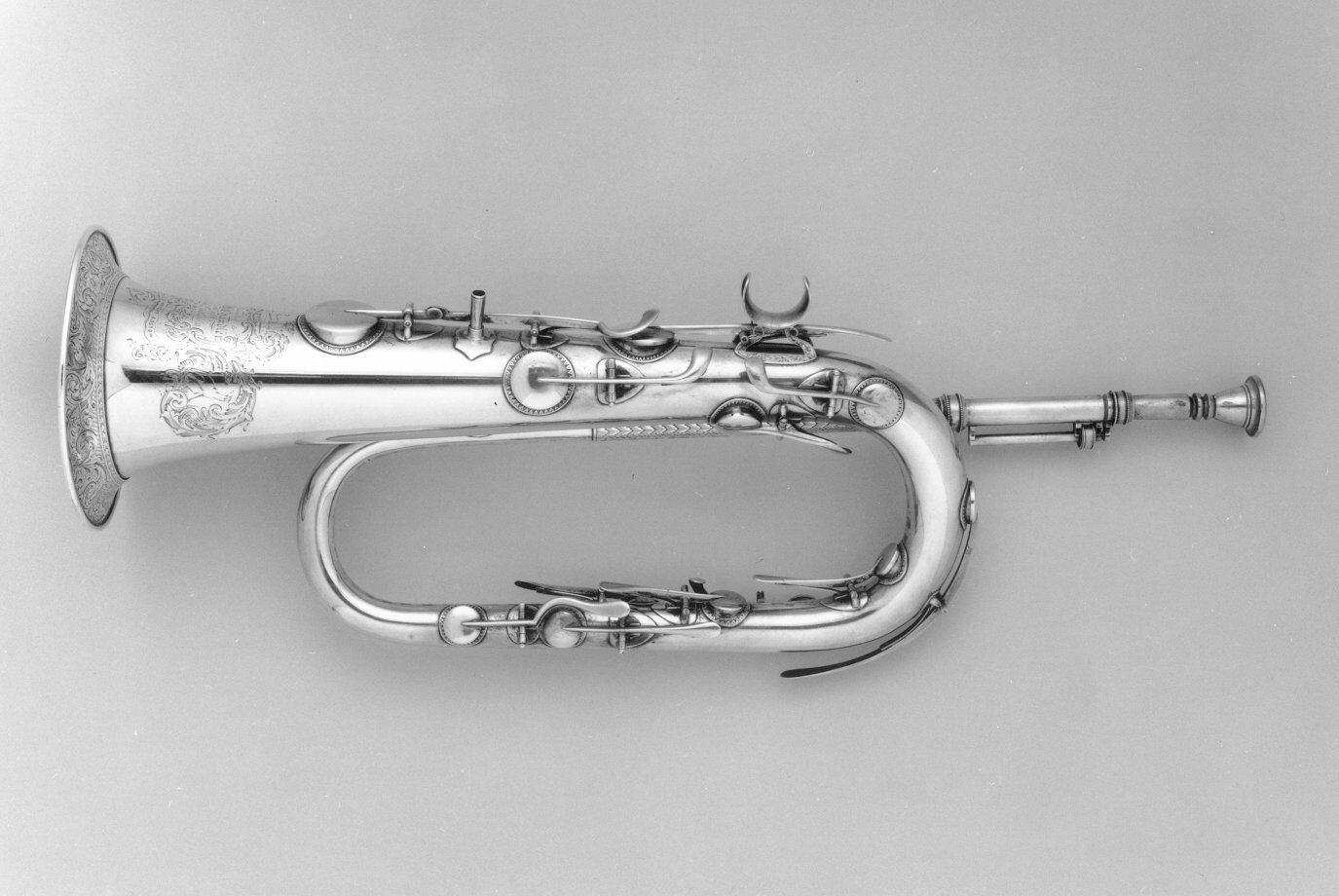
A Keyed Bugle, much like the instrument that Richard Willis would have performed on. Utilizes keys that cover large holes in the bell, similar to a modern saxophone.

At the conclusion of the War of 1812, the need for a professional band was solidified. Joseph Gardner Swift (3rd Superintendent of West Point from 1812–1814 and Chief of Engineers of the U.S. Army from 1812–1818) authorized the purchase of new melodic instruments. By the fall of 1815, the instruments and band uniforms ordered by Alden Partridge had arrived. A series of orders moved selected army musicians in 1815 and arranged for their training at the 6th Infantry Band School at Governor's Island and attachment to West Point. By April of 1816, the band was fully staffed for professional concerts and parades. Within two years of its formation, the military band at West Point was touring the East Coast and fostering West Point's image as a major tourist attraction. Its reputation eclipsed area orchestras of the day and preceded the formation of the New York Philharmonic by twenty-five years.

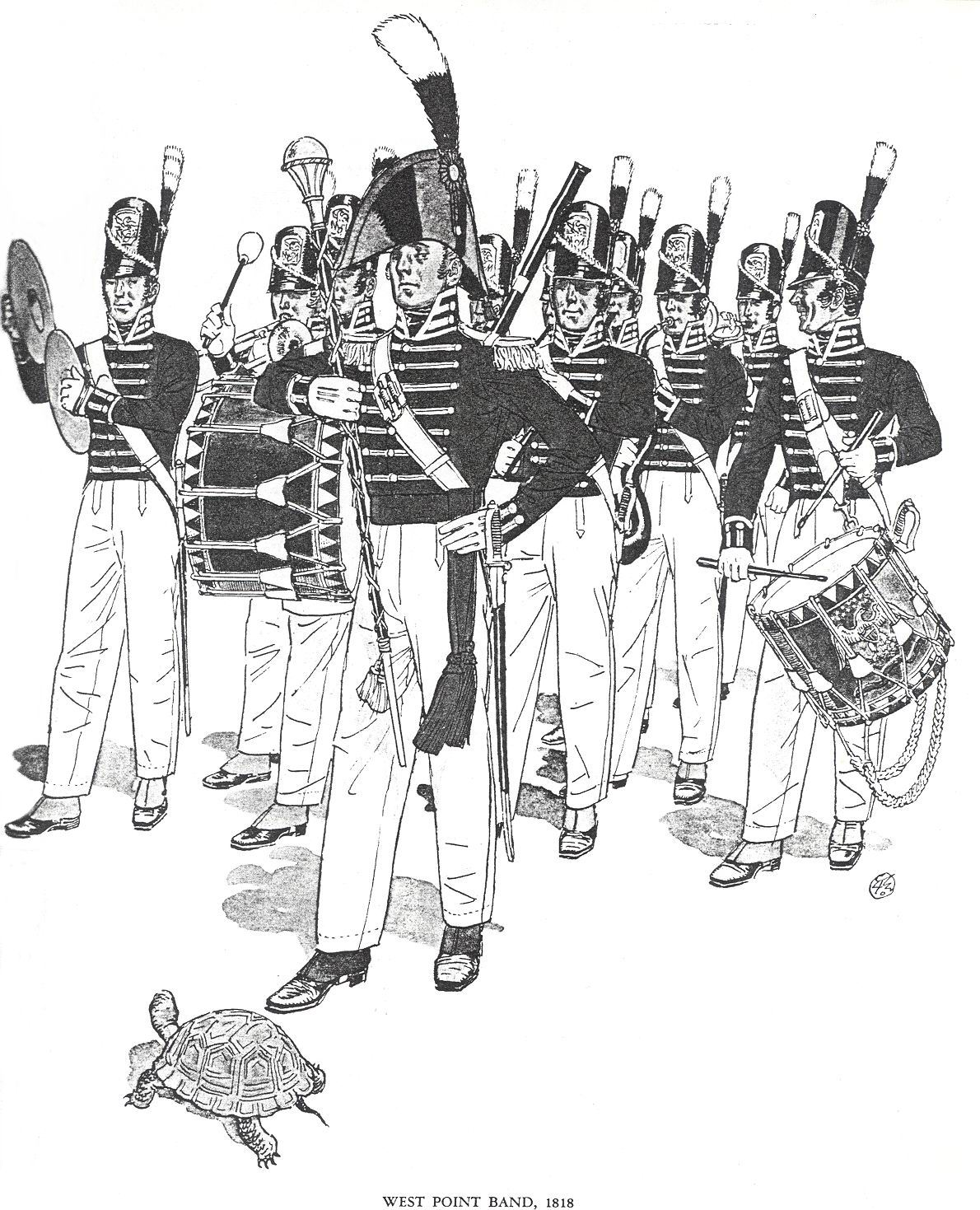
Sketch of the military band at West Point. 1818.

By 1817, leadership for the West Point Band was given to a civilian with the pay and benefits of a Major. This uncommon honor was granted by the Secretary of War and later approved by Congress. Teacher of Music Richard Willis was an accomplished instructor of all band instruments but was a known virtuoso on the Kent Bugle or Keyed Bugle, an early chromatic keyed brass instrument. The Keyed Bugle would soon become obsolete with the invention of the modern piston valve around 1821, a technology that is still in use today on modern brass instruments.

During this period, the ensemble was performing on a full range of instruments. The first official band muster roll, taken in 1817, included (1) bassoon, (2) flutes, (1) Royal Kent bugle, (5) clarinets, (2) French horns, (1) trumpet, (1) trombone, (7) fifes, and (1) drum. Throughout 1817, Richard Willis led the band in many documented performances; for President James Monroe's first official visit to West Point to inspect the military facilities, in New York City at the Scudder Museum, for funerals at the West Point Cemetery, a ceremony ordered by Sylvanus Thayer to unveil the new Wood Monument, concerts on the Hudson River, cadet exercises on academy grounds, and the much-loved annual outdoor concerts at the ruins of Fort Putnam.

To the dwellers on the plain below, the effect on the aforesaid fourth of July was indescribably fine; the guns thundering and echoing in a region so far above us, their gleams of fire flashing out amid the clouds of white smoke that rolled their eddying volumes round the old, dismantled ramparts.

The salute was followed by a full burst of martial harmony from the band, who had also gone up into the ruins; all playing so admirably and in such perfect unison, that the whole of their various instruments sounded like one alone -but like one whose grand and exquisite tones seemed scarcely to belong to earth.

The band had their fourth of July dinner within the dilapidated recesses of the moss-grown fortress, and frequently during the day, we heard their music. Sometimes the soft sweet warblings of the octave flute rose alone upon the air; then the clear melodious tones of Willis’s bugle seemed to “lap the soul in Elysium;” then came the clarionets deepened by the trombone; and finally, the loud and thrilling notes of the bass-drum struck grandly in, and swelled the full tide of sound till the rocks seemed to tremble with its reverberations. Music, like painting, has its lights and shadows.

— Miss Leslie, Recollections of West Point, Graham's American Monthly Magazine, April 1842; referring to Willis' Band

=== Professional years: 1819–1850 ===
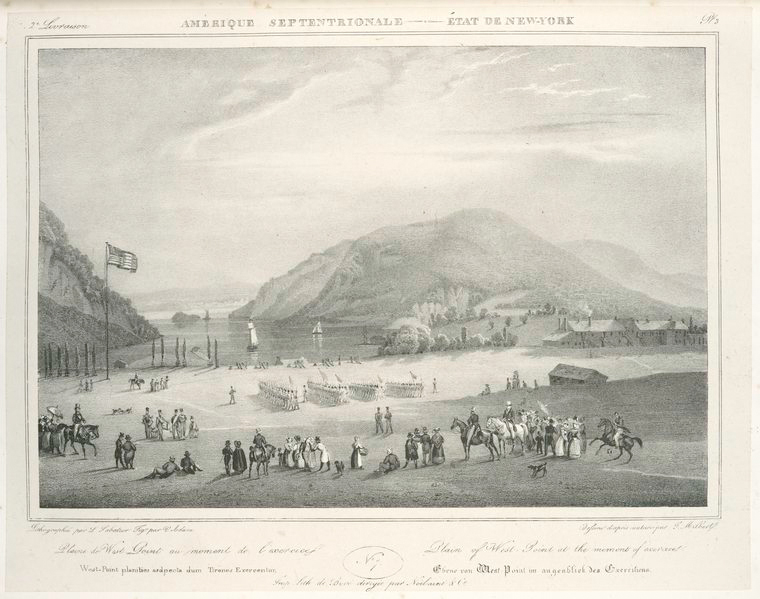
West Point Band in 1826. Performing music during cadet exercises. Lithograph by Milbert.

Willis' appointment as Teacher of Music established the group's elite status early on and set the ensemble apart from other military bands of the time. Through a regimen of daily rehearsals and a busy performance schedule, Willis honed the musicians into a polished ensemble. During Willis' tenure as the band's leader (and until his death in 1830), the band would perform for presidents, national and international historic figures, dignitaries visiting West Point, for crowds in New York City (and other cities like Boston and Philadelphia), and alongside the Corps of Cadets.

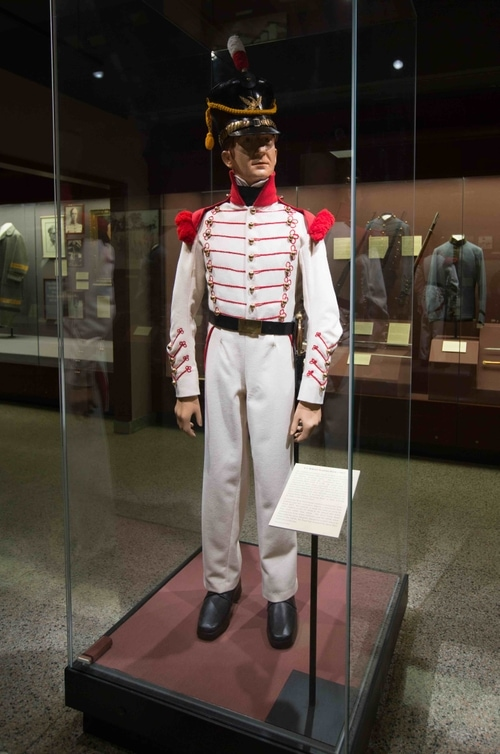
USMA Band Uniform circa 1825. Uniform would have been used under TM Richard Willis. The basic white with red trim design was used by the band until the late 19th century.

In 1820, the band and Willis performed a regular concert series at West Point for cadets, tours, and visitors. Cadet diaries of the time document that the audiences had their favorite pieces performed at these concerts: "Hunter's Chorus" from Der Freischutz, a piece called "The Nightengale" which featured flute players from the band playing from the trees, and an Irish folk tune arranged by Willis for band entitled, "Oh! Mary when the Wild Wind Blows." Some of these pieces were probably performed in August of that year for a special concert in New York City Harbor for the U.S. Secretary of State (and later 6th President), John Quincy Adams.

==== Long march to Boston ====
Under Superintendent Sylvanus Thayer the United States Corps of Cadets accompanied by the USMA Band undertook numerous summer marches (or “campaigns” as some cadets called them) as a method of garnering good will towards the Academy. Hugely successful by all accounts, the Corps was greeted by the enthralled citizens of New York City (1816, 1817, 1819), Philadelphia (1820) and, the most famous march, Boston (1821). It was during the 1817 march to Philadelphia that Willis and the West Point Band reunited with famous keyed bugle player and band leader Francis Johnson. Willis and Johnson were musical colleagues and friends.

On July 20, 1821, the Corps of Cadets boarded steamboats to Troy and from there began the 170 mile march eastward, arriving on August 7th and establishing “Camp Hamilton” on Boston Common. Numerous tours, galas and visitations were held during the two week stay, and the USMA Band figured prominently, even performing for former President John Adams. Bandmaster Willis reprised the President's old campaign song, Adams and Liberty, by then a popular tune known to the younger generation as The Star-Spangled Banner.

“The West Point Band - This Excellent Martial Corps consists of Five Clarinets, Two Flutes, Two Horns, One Bassoon, One Trumpet, One Trombone, One Bugle, One Drum. Mr. Willis, the principal musician and leader, with the Bugle, has given many wonderful specimens of genius and execution, combined with taste and science, in the various military pieces performed by this numerous and well disciplined corps.”

— The Euterpeiad

==== General Lafayette's American tour ====
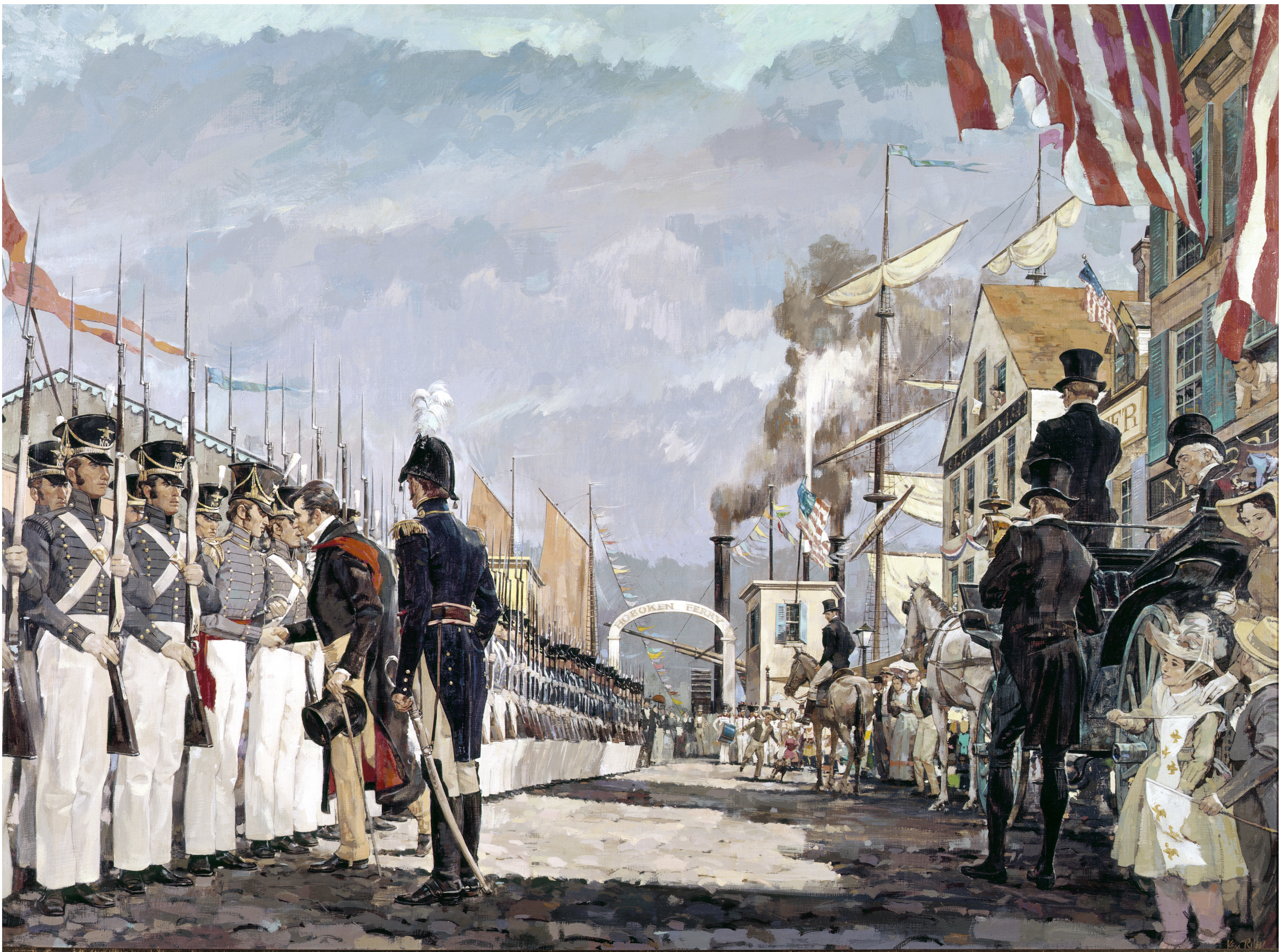
Painting of Lafayette's 1824 visit to New York by Ken Riley. West Point Band in its distinctive red and white uniform visible in the background.

In the summer of 1824, Willis and the West Point Band had yet another historic experience when the revered General Lafayette, hero of the Revolutionary War and now retiree of sixty-six years arrived in New York Harbor aboard the Cadmus. The beloved Frenchman was a hero to Americans for his victories at the battles of Brandywine, Monmouth, and Yorktown. Willis and the Band took part in at least four major receptions around New York City which honored the distinguished guest. They greeted Lafayette on his arrival off Staten Island on August 15, 1824. They were at Fort Lafayette at the harbor when Lafayette inspected that site on September 6, 1824. They played the reception in Castle Garden on September 14, 1824, and they were on hand to welcome Lafayette to West Point when he stepped ashore to pay his respects to the institution he styled our "bulwark of national defense." Willis and his musicians may even have been aboard the Cadmus during Lafayette's travels to upstate New York.

==== Opening of the Erie Canal ====
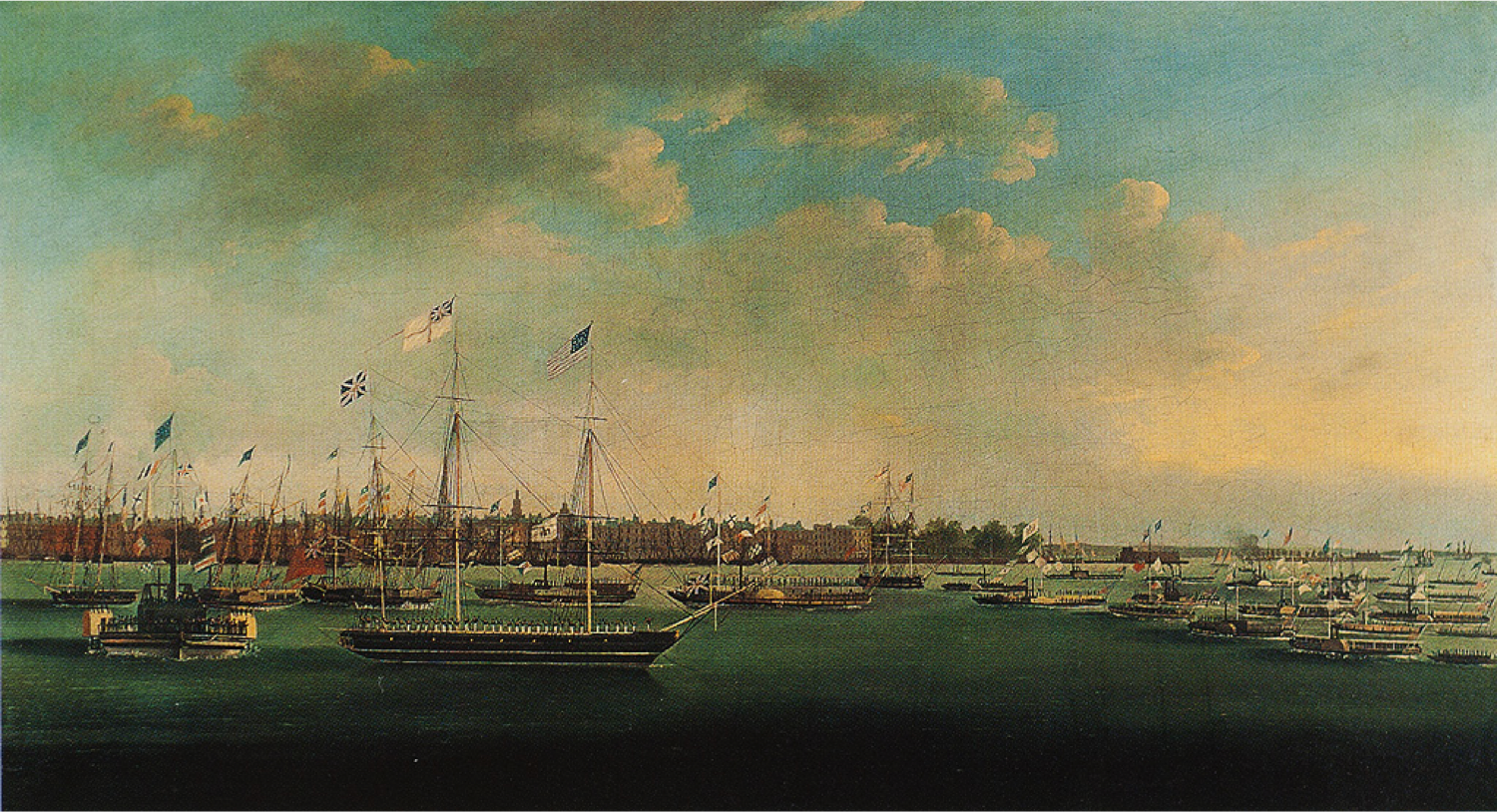
1825 cerebration for the opening of the Erie Canal.

Richard Willis also wrote music celebrating the opening of the Erie Canal on October 26th, 1825. The work, The Grand Canal March was well received in its day and is still to be found in U.S. music collections throughout America. Willis' Grand Canal March was premiered by him and "his elegant band of music" during final ceremonies marking the waterway's opening. This first performance was heard toward the close of a fortnight's festivities ending a nine-year project that brought unprecedented growth and prosperity to northern New York State and made New York Harbor the most significant port on the eastern seaboard. Participants enjoyed civic salutes that included processions, speeches, entertainment, the firing of cannons, and countless bonfires.

==== "Ol' Bentz," The Bugler ====
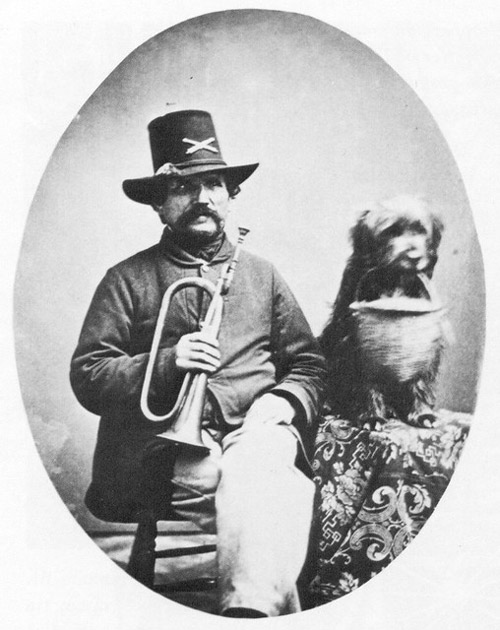
Louis Bentz, or "Ol' Bentz." Famed bugler at West Point.

In the 200 plus years that musicians have been stationed at West Point, it is more than likely Private Louis Bentz is the most notable. Born in Orlofen, Germany at the turn of the 19th century, Bentz (originally spelled Benz) was a former cavalry musician and a master of the keyed bugle. In 1834 he enlisted as a U.S. Army musician and served at West Point as the Chief Bugler for 35 years, retiring in 1874. He was supposedly quite eccentric.

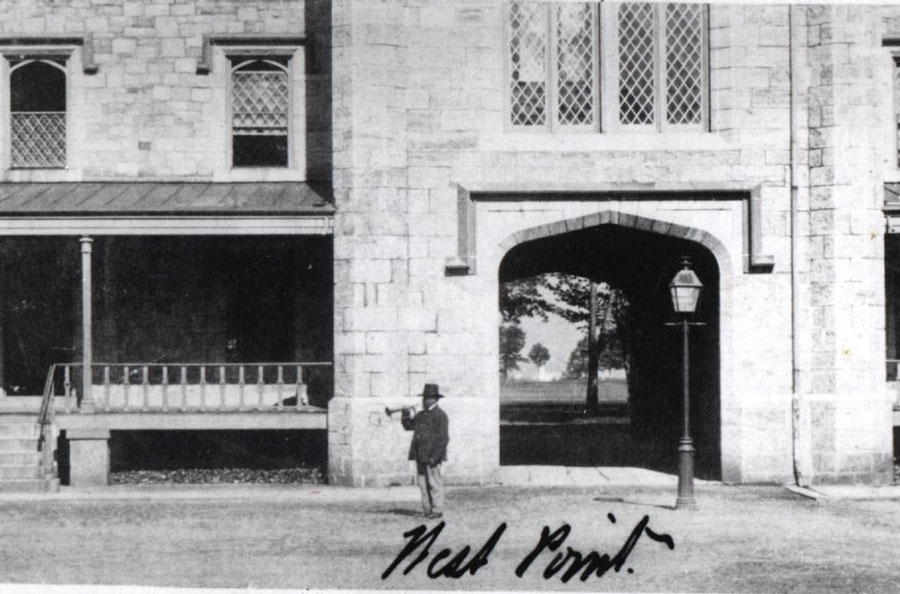
Louis Bentz sounding the bugle at the Cadet Barracks. Circa 1870.

Over his four-decade long career at West Point, cadets knew Bentz as “Old Bentz,” “The Bugler,” and, “Old Wax.” Bentz was called “Old Wax” for chewing honeycomb. When he had to play bugle, he would simply deposit the wax on the instrument, and then pop it back into his mouth after he'd finished playing. Bentz’s bugle is housed at the West Point Museum, where one can see traces of old beeswax still stuck to the horn.

=== Civil War and the Gilded Age 1850–1900 ===
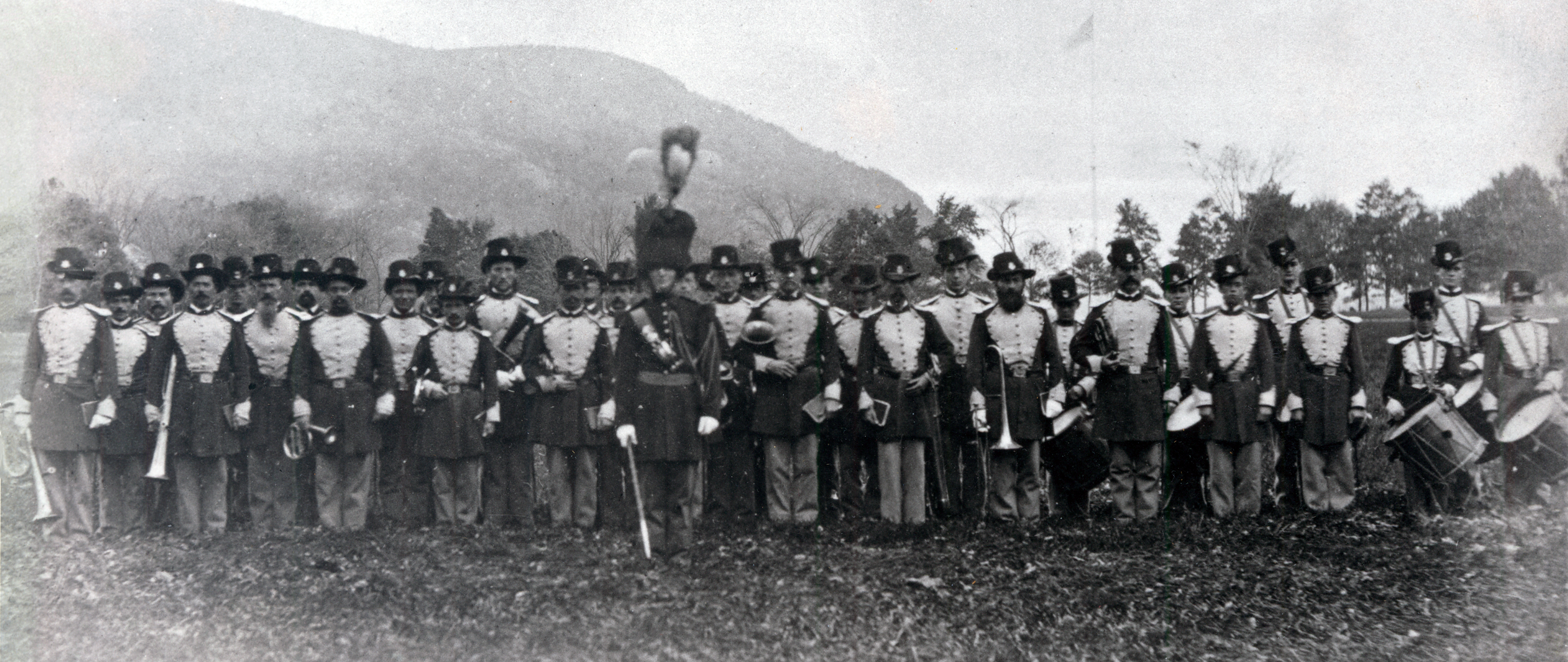
West Point Band circa 1857 (or possibly 1860s).

During the lean years of the 1850s, the Academy would mourn the death of President Taylor, the death of Captain Alden Partridge, and the Teacher of Music (TM) would find himself doing two full-time jobs in an effort to keep from being destitute. This TM, Augustus Appelles composed marches, performed on violin with the Band, and performed as a full-time Post Organist.

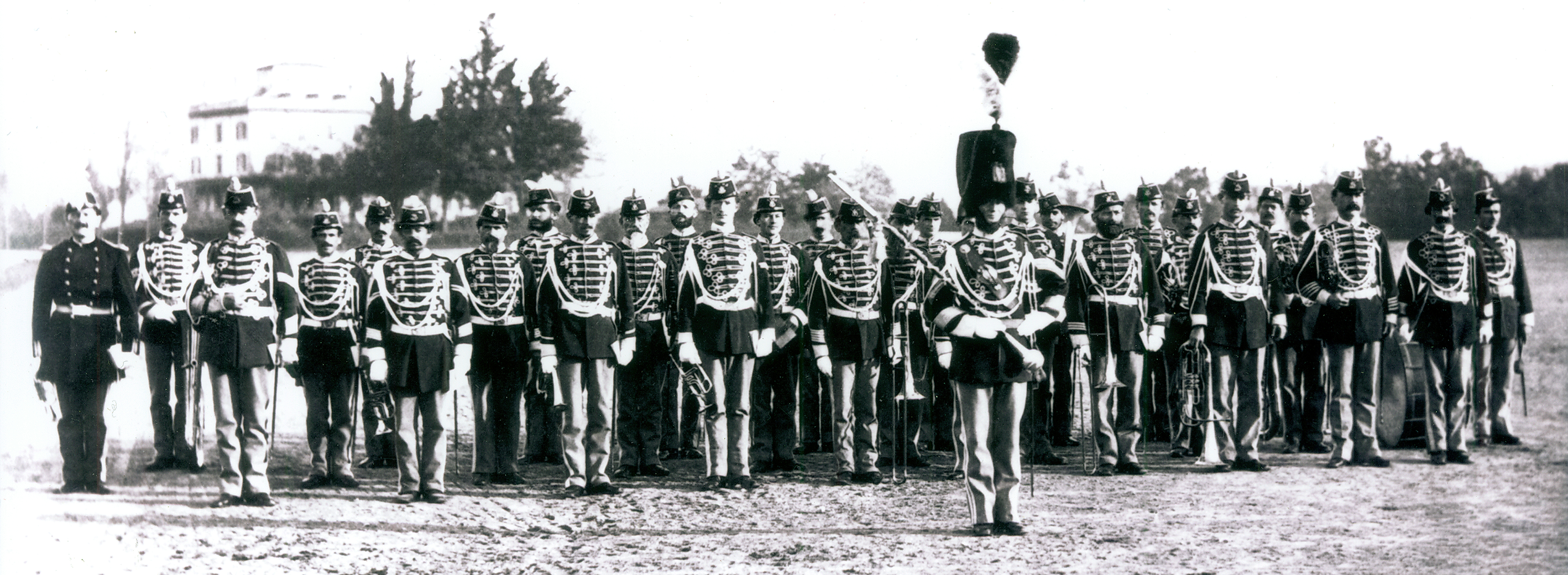
USMA Band under the direction of TM Charles Rehm. 1878.

During the Civil War, the band would continue its duties performing for Cadet training, drill, and military ceremony. Also, during this period General Winfield Scott retired from the Army and moved back to New York near West Point. He is buried at West Point Cemetery. In June 1862, President Lincoln visited Highland Falls and West Point to see General Winfield Scott. The band performed an after-midnight concert at the Cozzens Hotel in Highland Falls during a pouring rain. President Lincoln is said to have slept through the music. President Lincoln was kind enough to personally thank Charles Rehm in written correspondence dated February 7, 1862.

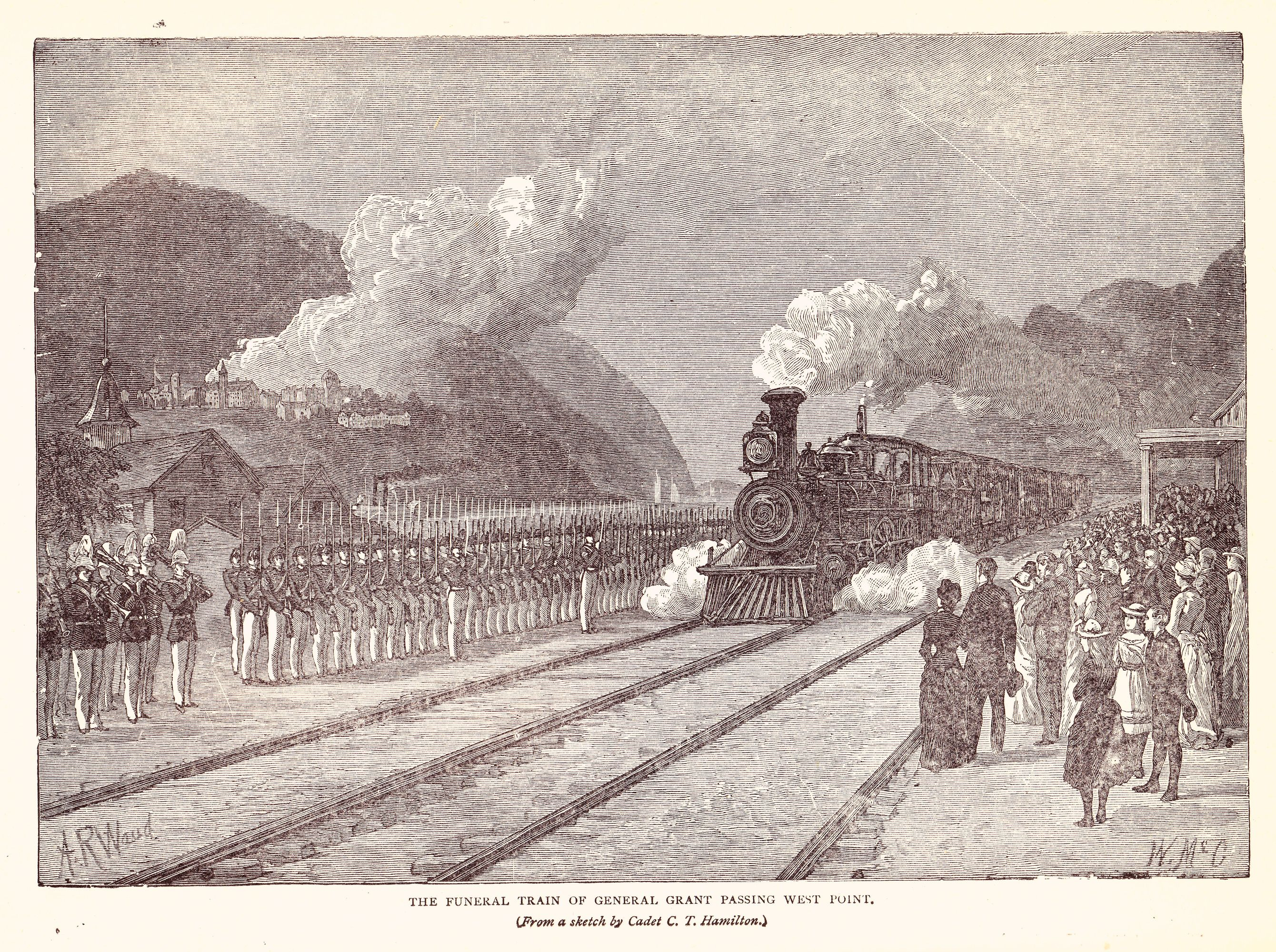
Sketch of Grant’s funeral train passing through West Point. Band is performing to the left of the cadets.

After the Civil War, the band may have performed for Ulysses S. Grant's first presidential inauguration parade in 1868, although there is no material evidence. However, it is confirmed through correspondence that the band was present at his second inaugural parade in 1873. This is the first known Inaugural for both the Band and the Corps of Cadets. In addition to this, the Band performed for Prince Alexis of Russia in 1871 and the 1876 United States Centennial Exposition in Philadelphia, PA.

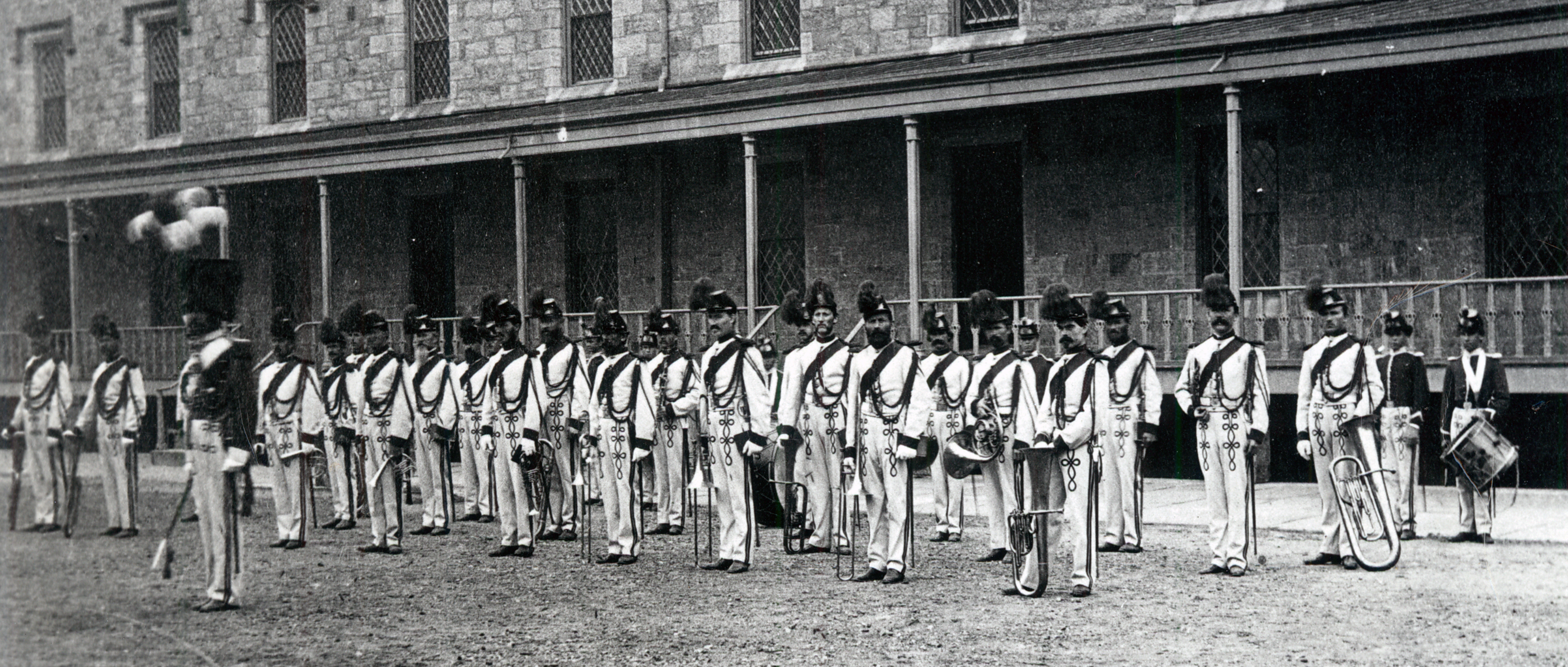
USMA Band in front of Cadet Barracks. 1890.

In 1877, the Band performed for the Funeral of General George Armstrong Custer who is buried at the West Point Cemetery. The band also marched in the funeral parade for General William Tecumseh Sherman in 1891 in New York City and for the Funeral of Ulysses S. Grant in 1885. For President Grant, the band performed as the Corps of Cadets rendered their final respects as the funeral train stopped at West Point one final time.

1890 marked the first ever Army-Navy football game, which the band supported with music. This tradition continues to the present day, as the Corps of Cadets march onto the field for the opening review ceremonies and also throughout the game in the stands. The band also performed at the famed Chicago and Louisiana Purchase (St. Louis) Expositions in 1893 and 1904.

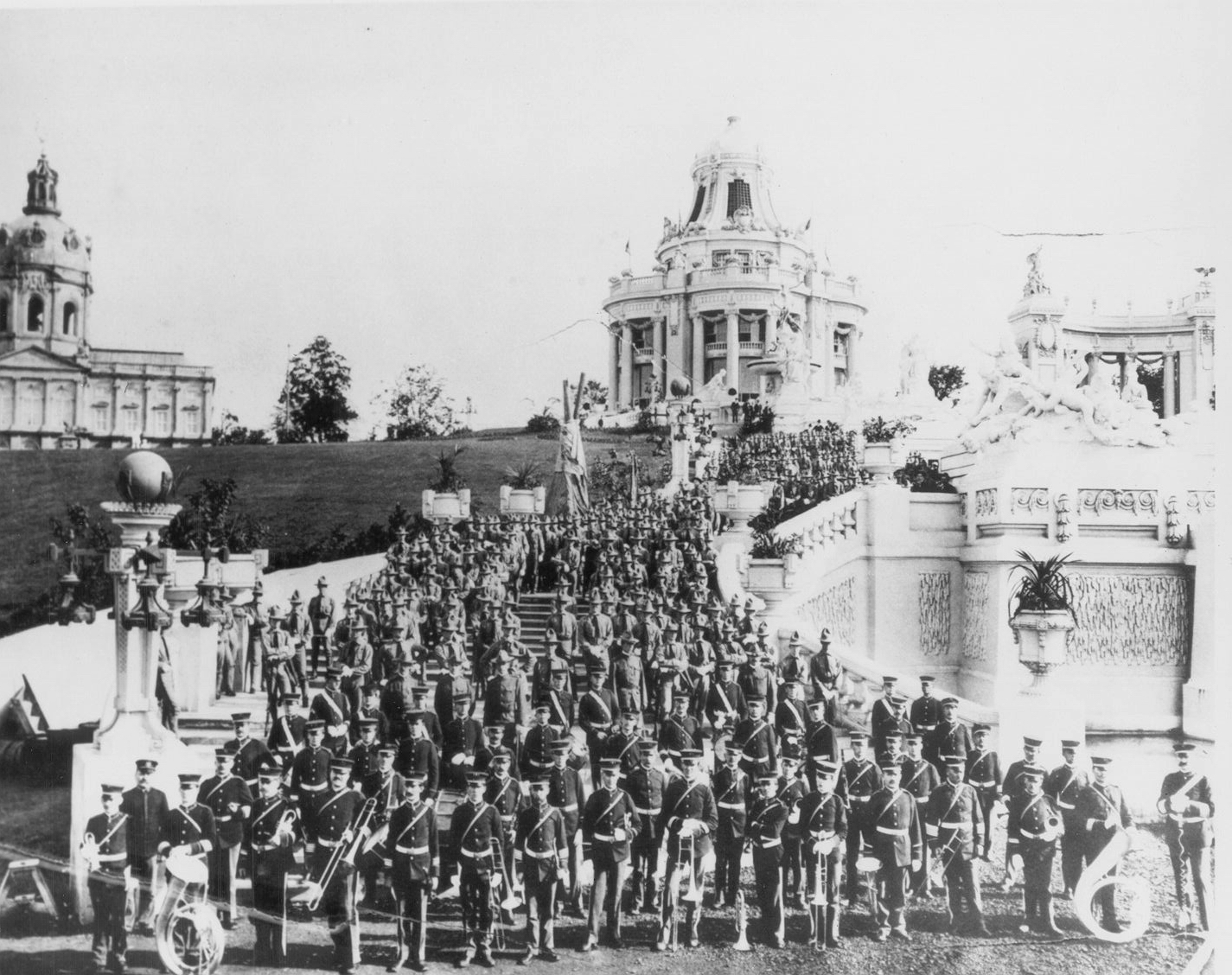
USMA Band at the 1904 St. Louis Exposition under the direction of TM Essigke.

== Notable alumni ==
West Point Band members have often accepted major musical positions around the world following their service. Even though this list is far from complete, it accurately portrays the caliber and depth of talent which has graced the band over the past two centuries.

- Edward Birdwell, French Horn - American Brass Quintet
- Larry Black, Trumpet - Atlanta Symphony Orchestra
- Pat Smith, Cello - Atlanta Symphony Orchestra
- Joseph Clodfelter, Viola - Baltimore Symphony Orchestra
- Edward Patey, Violin - Baltimore Symphony Orchestra
- Larry Combs, Principal Clarinet - Chicago Symphony Orchestra
- Norm Sweikert, French Horn - Chicago Symphony Orchestra
- Gordon Peters, Percussion - Chicago Symphony Orchestra
- Roger Klein, String Bass - Chicago Symphony Orchestra
- Eric Wicks, Violin - Chicago Symphony Orchestra
- Dave Zauder, Trumpet - Cleveland Orchestra
- Paul Kitzman, Trombone - Dallas Symphony
- Steve Girko, Clarinet - Dallas Symphony
- LeRoy Fenstermach, Viola - Detroit Symphony
- Robert Pangborn, Percussion - Detroit Symphony
- Raymond Turner, Trombone - Detroit Symphony
- Tom Stevens, Principal Trumpet - Los Angeles Philharmonic
- Rob Roy McGregor, Trumpet - Los Angeles Philharmonic
- David Weiss, Principal Oboe - Los Angeles Philharmonic
- Alan Goodman, Bassoon - Los Angeles Philharmonic
- Jim Walker, Flute - Los Angeles Philharmonic
- Mel Broiles, Principal Trumpet - Metropolitan Opera Orchestra
- Hal Janks, Bass Trombone - Metropolitan Opera Orchestra
- Robert Hailey, Trumpet - Metropolitan Opera Orchestra
- Robert Gillespie, Trombone - Metropolitan Opera Orchestra
- TM George Essigke, Violin - Metropolitan Opera Orchestra
- TM Philip Egner, Cello - Metropolitan Opera Orchestra
- Robert Nagel, Trumpet - New York Brass Quintet
- Paul Ingraham, French Horn - New York City Ballet Orchestra
- Donald Harwood, Bass Trombone - New York Philharmonic
- Ranier DeIntinis, French Horn - New York Philharmonic
- Larry Newland, Assistant Conductor/Viola - New York Philharmonic
- Dom Bello, Oboe - New York Philharmonic
- Bill Blount, Principal Clarinet - Orchestra of St. Lukes
- Frank Kaderabek, Principal Trumpet - Philadelphia Orchestra
- Paul Krzywicki, Tuba - Philadelphia Orchestra
- Thomas Fay, Oboe - Pittsburgh Symphony
- Felix Padilla, Bass Trombone - “The President’s Own” United States Marine Band
- Philip Broome, Euphonium - “The President’s Own” United States Marine Band
- Samuel Ross, Clarinet - “The President’s Own” United States Marine Band
- Malcolm McNab, Studio Trumpet - Hollywood

== Gallery ==
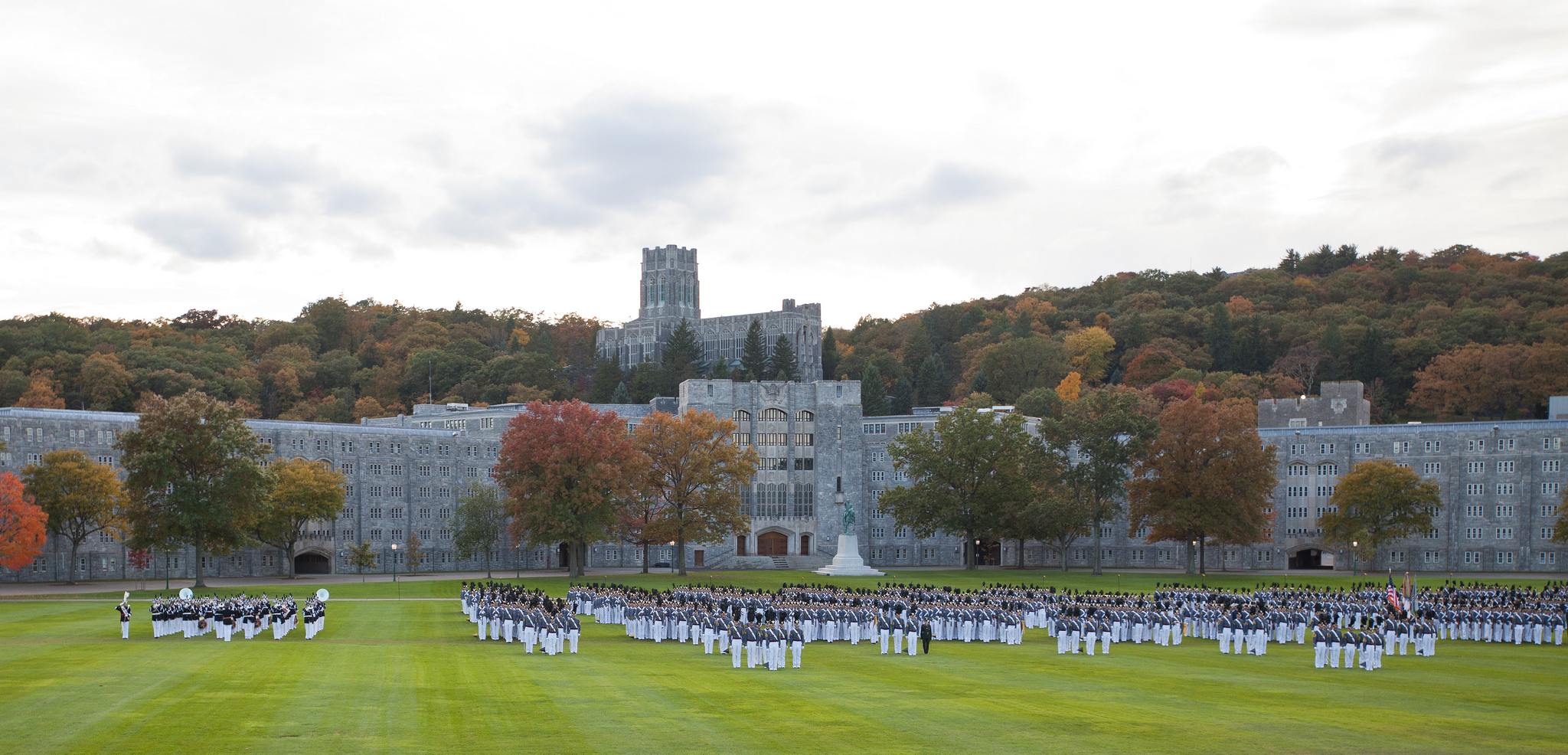
The West Point Band joined the Corps of Cadets on The Plain for a pass in review

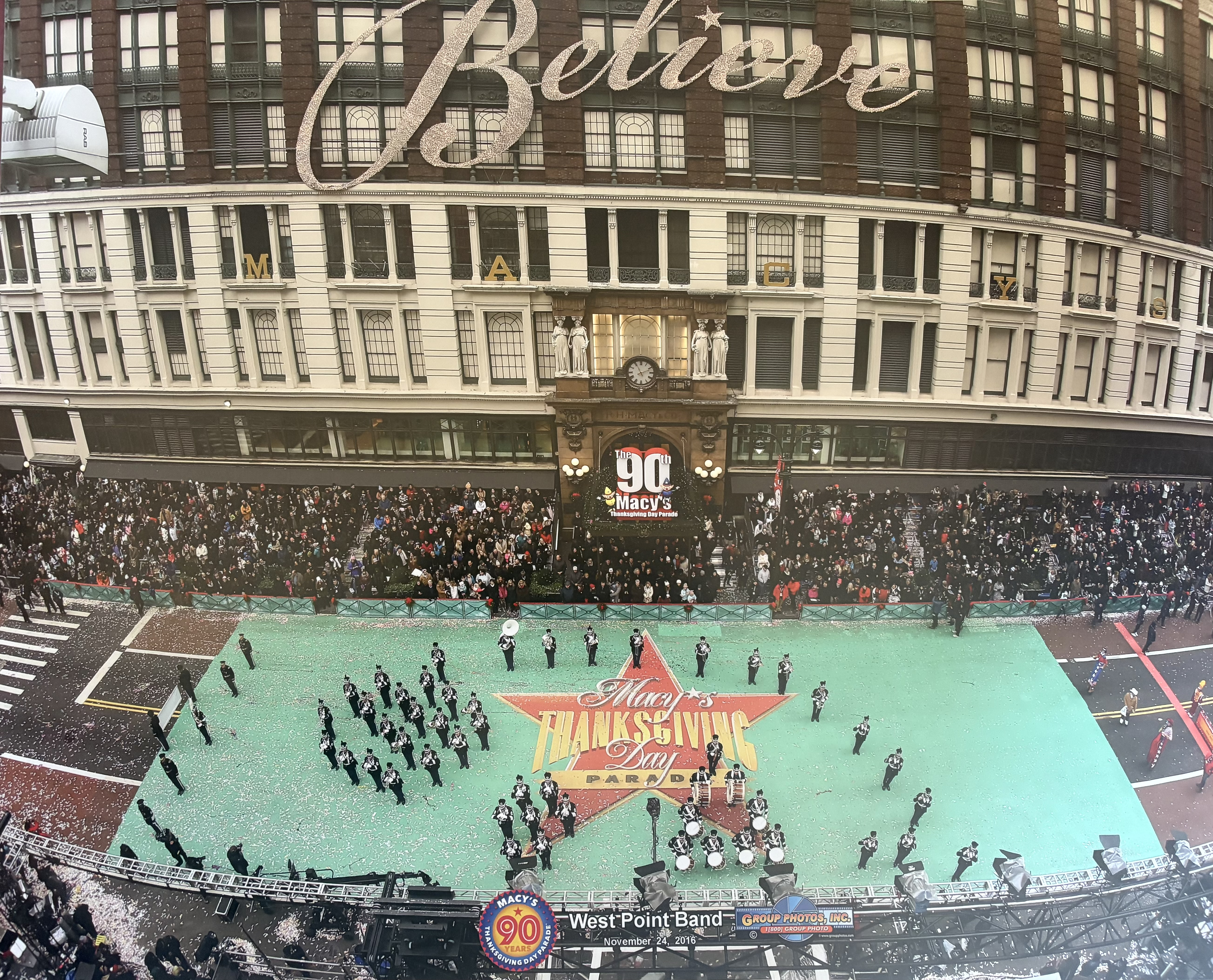
The West Point Band performs at the 2016 Macy's Thanksgiving Day Parade

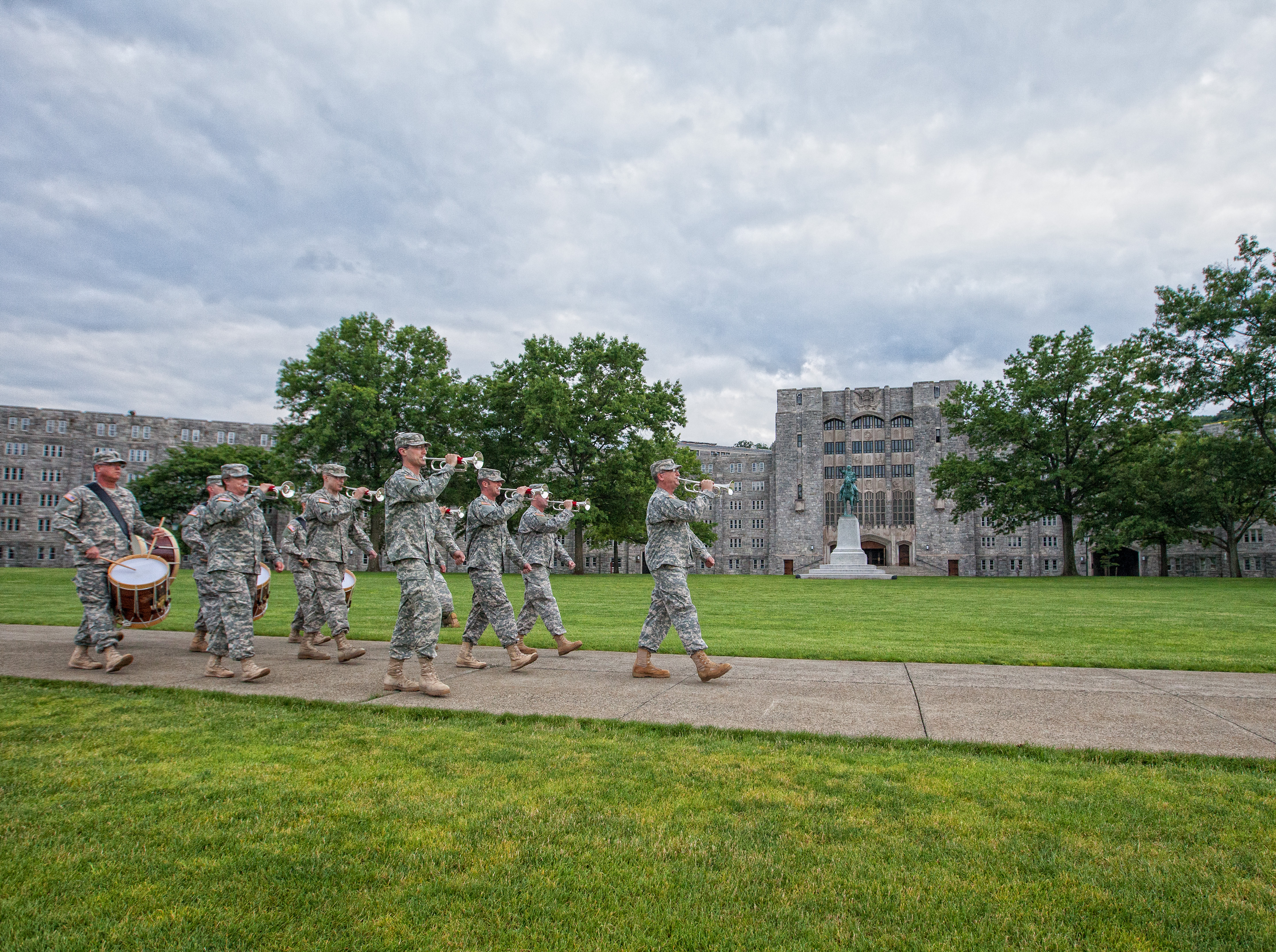
The Hellcats participate in the United States Military Academy's Summer Leadership Seminar

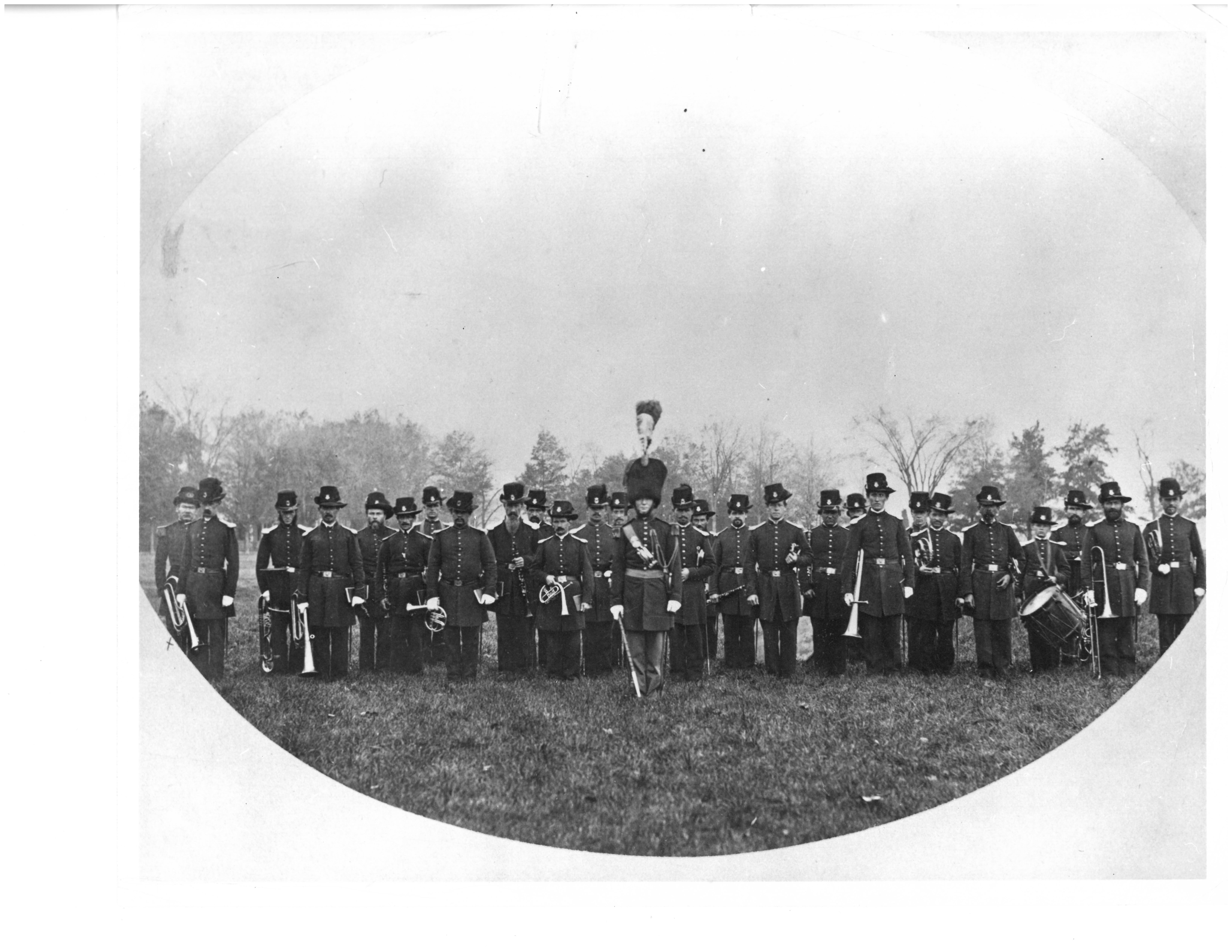
Earliest known photograph of the West Point Band, 1865 near Trophy Point

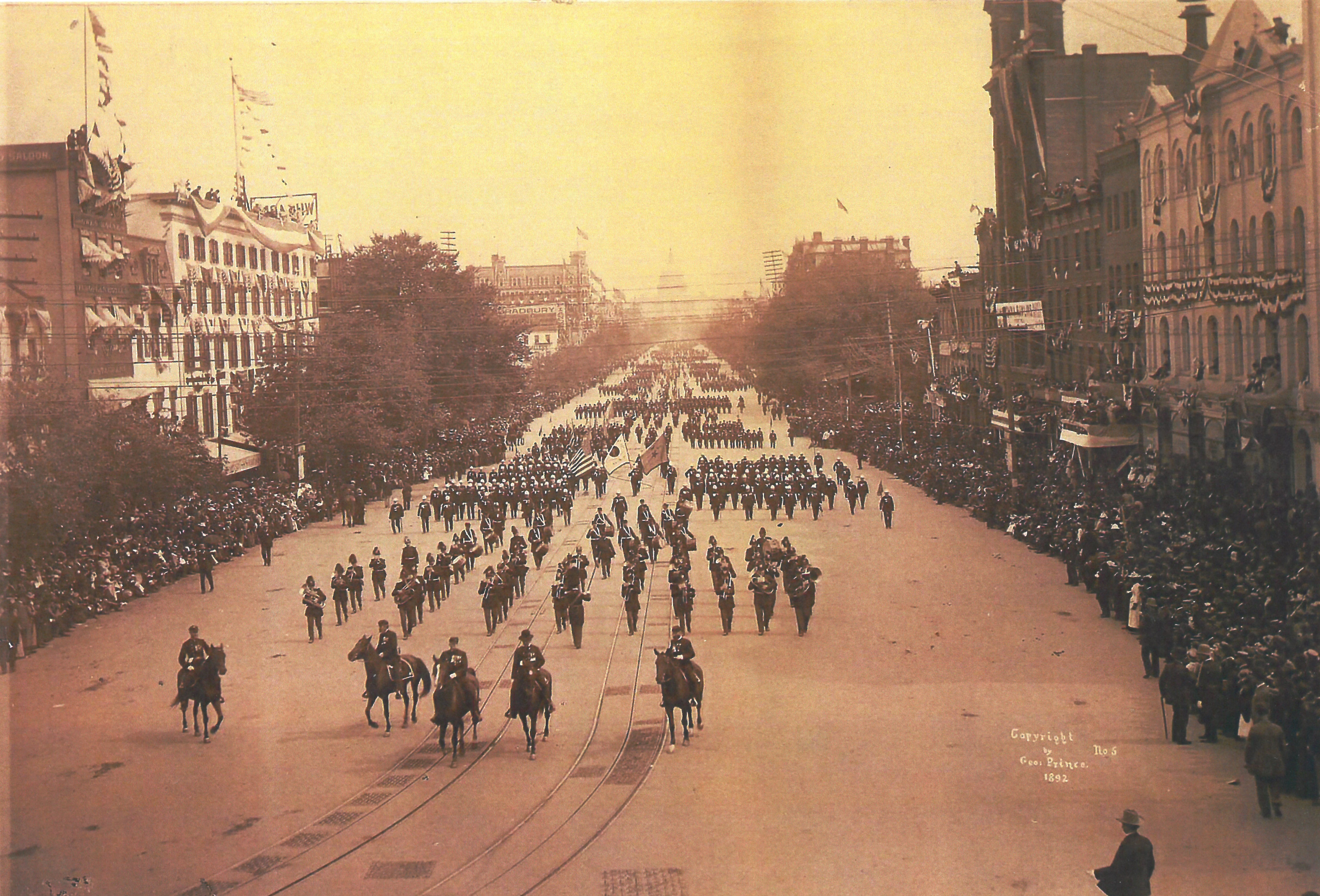
West Point Band in 1892; marching in the inauguration parade of President Garfield

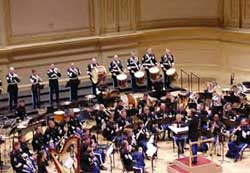
West Point Band at Carnegie Hall

== Music ==
"On, Brave Old Army Team"
By Philip Egner

"Graduation March"
By Francis Resta

Salute cannon/Reveille
Performed by The Hellcats

Funeral Taps
By Daniel Butterfield, Taps performed by The Hellcats

== See also ==
- The Jazz Knights
- List of United States military premier ensembles
- United States military bands
