= Sonata for Trombone (Cooper) =

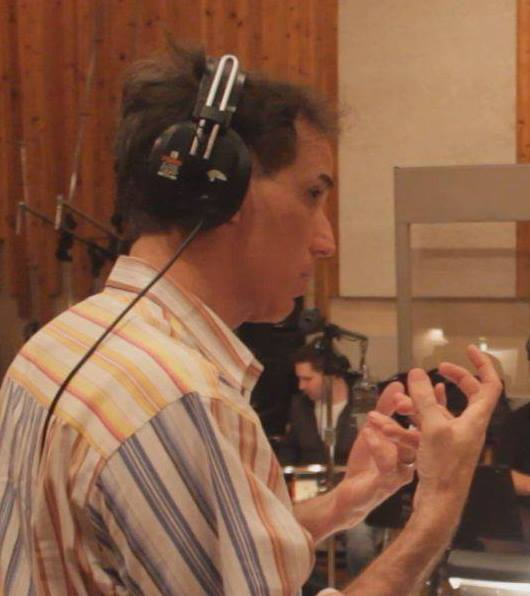
Jack Cooper in 2014

Jack Cooper's Sonata for Trombone (and piano) was published in 2007, the date of composition is 1998. It has become a widely performed work in the modern trombone repertoire and is featured on two highly acclaimed recordings with Centaur Records and Summit Records. Most notably the work features improvisation sections and a wide range of stylistic interpretation. The sonata is Cooper's first of three chamber solo works for trombone; two sonatas for tenor trombone and one for bass trombone.

== History ==
=== Background ===
Cooper studied in the early 1990s in New York under Manny Albam and was encouraged to start writing chamber music. Though Cooper's first work with Albam was string quartet writing, the Sonata for Trombone was the first important chamber work to be completed from Cooper. The Sonata for Trombone was commissioned in 1997 by the Phi Mu Alpha Sinfonia chapter at the University of Texas at Austin School of Music. It is unclear when the premiere took place as this was at the University of Texas in sometime during 1999.

Cooper described the inspiration for the Trombone Sonata in an NPR interview, saying:

I have been very fortunate to have played with and educated by some outstanding trombone players. This includes my first band director in California during middle school, he played very good trombone and very insuring as music educator. Even though the Sonata was commissioned by another organization, the sound I had in my head was Luis Bonilla. This was sort of by default because we are such close friends and I heard and played with him in college in Los Angeles.

He continued:

A great deal of the Classical, Afro-Latin, jazz (improvisation) influences in the work again reflect the sound I had in my head when composing. The recording (for Centaur) is definitive in my opinion as Luis interpreted the work at a very high level...basically he knew what i wanted."

=== Performances and recordings ===
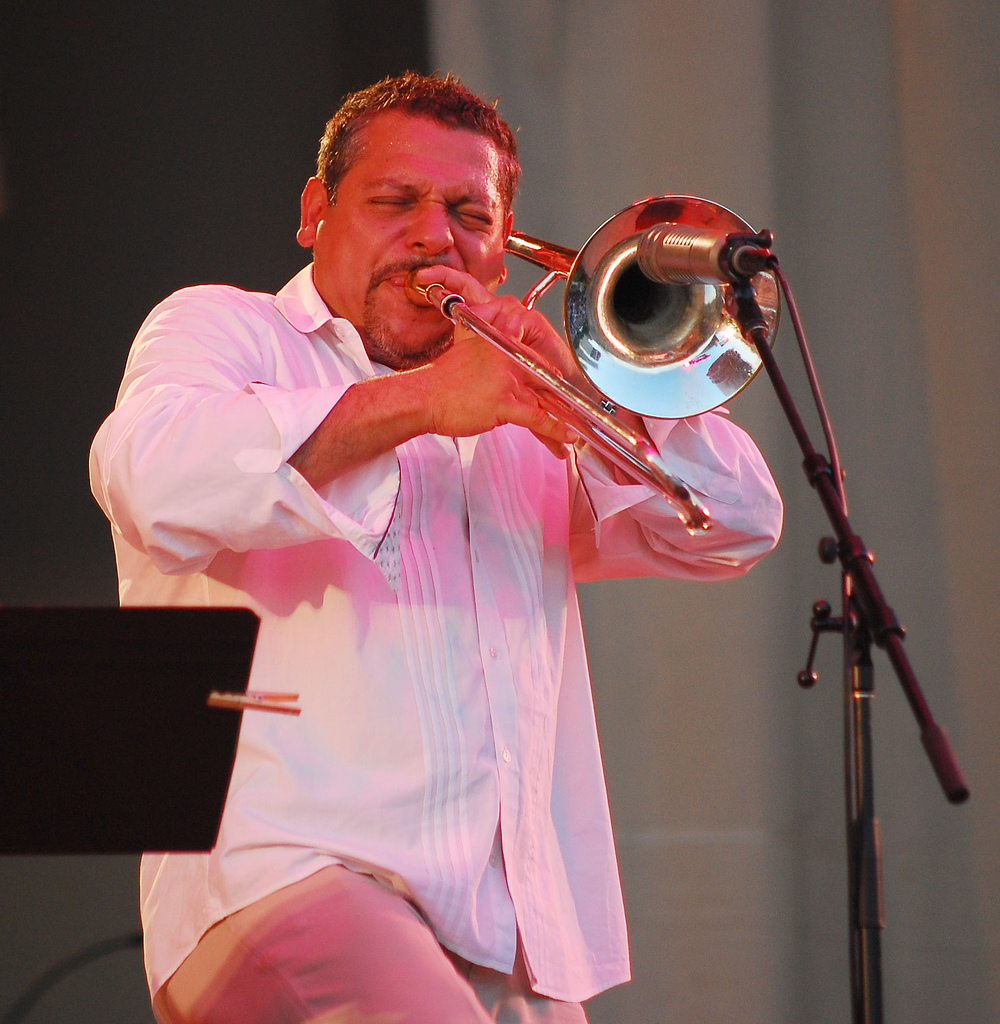
internationally known trombone artist Luis Bonilla is featured on the first studio recording of Cooper's Sonata for Trombone

The work has been played and featured at numerous concert and festival venues in North America, South America and the United Kingdom The list of trombone artists who have added the work to their repertoire is substantial to include Tom Brantley, Chris Buckholz, Luis Bonilla, Greg Luscomb, Lance Green, Michael Davidson, Mark Hetzler, John Mueller, Jonathan Warburton and many others. The premiere recording was completed for Centaur Records by Luis Bonilla and released in May 2010 on the CD The Chamber Wind Music of Jack Cooper.

The Trombone Sonata (manuscript) is one of the main subjects of a dissertation written in 2011 by Dr. Anthony Williams (music professor, University of Northern Iowa) on style and approach to four prominent 20th/21st Century jazz influenced, solo trombone works: Alec Wilder – Sonata for Trombone and Piano, Richard Peaslee – Arrows of Time, William Goldstein – Colloquy for solo trombone, Jack Cooper – Sonata For Trombone.

A second notable recording of Cooper's Sonata for Trombone is by artist Mark Hetzler on his 2015 CD recording Blues, Ballads and Beyond with Summit Records. French-Canadian music critic Jean-Yves Duperron, "...when I listen to the excellent (trombone) Sonata by Jack Cooper, I keep hearing flashbacks of Leonard Bernstein from the West Side Story days."

== Composition ==
=== Structure ===
The entire work has a duration of roughly 12 minutes and is composed in three movements:

1. Mambo
2. Solo
3. Afro Latin in 12/8, naningo

The first movement entitled Mambo is an aggressive, Latin piece with a range on the trombone from F to b1. The movement also includes an open, repeated section that allows the player to improvise if that choice is made.

The second or Solo movement is unaccompanied; only solo trombone. A single motive is developed and the entire work ranges from D to b1. The cadenza in the movement is free and left up to the creativity of the performer.

The last movement is entitled Naningo and employs a 12/8 Afro-Latin groove. The first and third movement of the work can be played with congas or bongos. Acoustic bass playing the bass line in the left hand of the piano score is a color that can be added.

=== Instrumentation ===
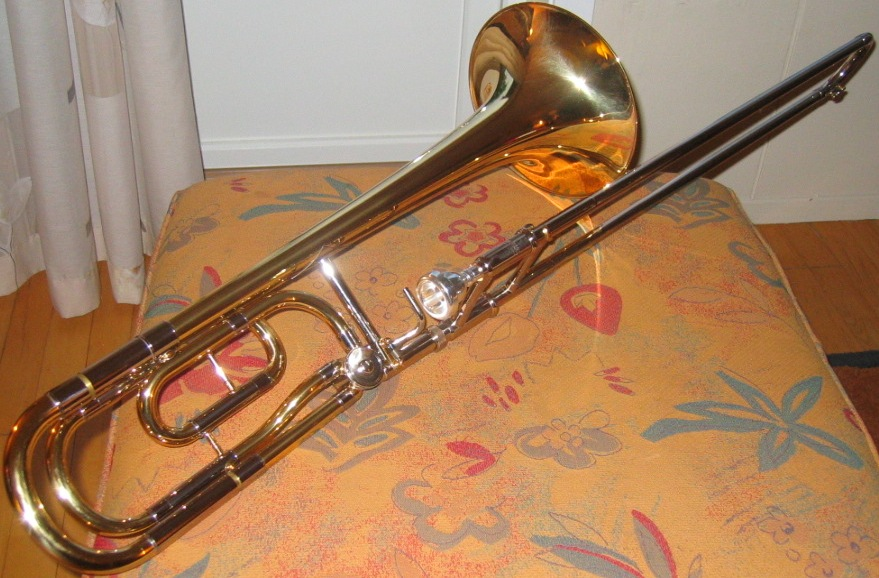
Cooper's sonata is written for the trombone with F trigger

The work is scored for solo trombone with (F attachment) and piano but was expanded twice in recorded versions to include acoustic bass, bongos and congas.

== See also ==
- Jack Cooper
- Trombone
- The Chamber Wind Music of Jack Cooper
- Blues, Ballads and Beyond
- Luis Bonilla
- Mark Hetzler

== Citations ==
- Converse, Andrew. ITA Journal, Literature Review: Sonata for Trombone and Piano, July 1, 2014, pp. 52
- Williams, Anthony N. (2011) – Dissertation: Interpretation of Jazz Influenced Solo Trombone Works by American Composers: Alec Wilder, William Goldstein, Richard Peaslee, and Jack Cooper
