= The Chamber Wind Music of Jack Cooper =

Studio album by Jack Cooper and various artists
- Released: May 1, 2010
- Recorded: November 2007–June 2009, Memphis, Tennessee
- Genre: Classical; chamber music; New Music; instrumental; jazz
- Length: 63:30
- Label: Centaur Records
- Producer: Jack Cooper

Jack Cooper chronology
Big Band Reflections of Cole Porter (2003)	The Chamber Wind Music of Jack Cooper (2010)	Mists: Charles Ives for Jazz Orchestra (2014)
- cat. #, Centaur CRC 3027

Audio sample
- "Sonata for Clarinet, Mov. III - Presto": file; help

The Chamber Wind Music of Jack Cooper is the first classical/new music studio recording featuring numerous performing artists recording chamber wind music of the composer on the Centaur Records label.

== Background ==
In 2006, it was decided a CD would be produced as a collaboration between Centaur Records and resources housed at the University of Memphis. Centaur Records agreed to have a CD completed for their label of either chamber wind works or chamber string/piano works; not a mix or both so to avoid a conflict in programming and marketing. Artists were selected based on virtuoso musicianship and familiarity with the composer's work; being able to play both written and improvised passages at a high musical level.

== Promotion and works from the compact disc ==
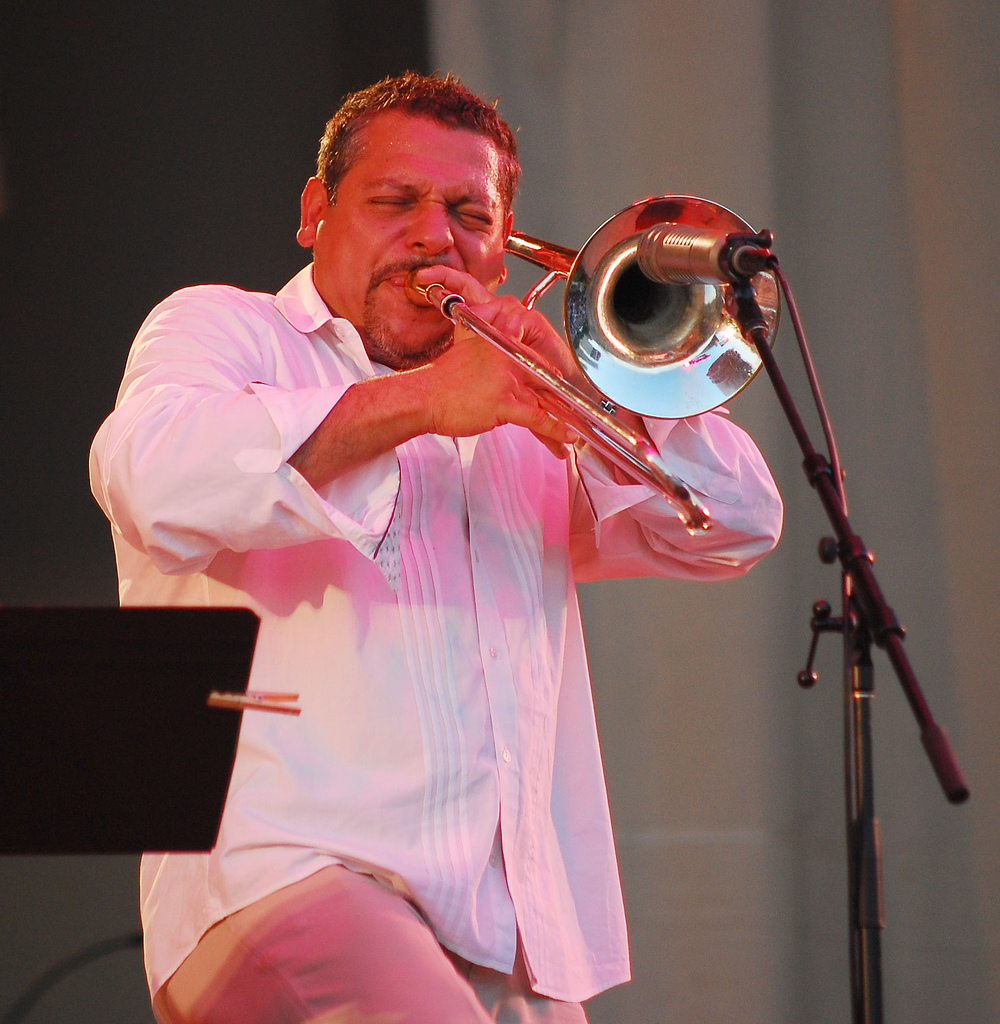
internationally known artist Luis Bonilla is featured on the Sonata for Trombone

Interviews were done in 2010 for WKNO-FM NPR Radio and WUMR Radio about the recording. The works from the CD have been played and featured at numerous concert venues in North and South American (U.S., Canada, Brazil), primarily by the artists who commissioned each work. The euphonium work One of the Missing was commissioned by John Mueller and is strong protest piece that both Cooper and Mueller felt very compelled to present in opposition to the Iraq War. The recording of the Trombone Sonata (and manuscript) is one of the main subjects in a dissertation written in 2011 by Dr. Anthony Williams (music professor, University of Northern Iowa) on style and approach to four prominent 20th/21st Century solo trombone works: Alec Wilder - Sonata for Trombone and Piano, Richard Peaslee - Arrows of Time, William Goldstein - Colloquy for solo trombone, Jack Cooper - Sonata For Trombone. The Trombone Sonata has also had a second prominent recording by trombone artist Mark Hetzler on his 2015 CD recording Blues, Ballads and Beyond with Summit Records. All brass works (trombone, brass quintet, euphonium) from the recording are currently published with Brassworks 4 Publishing. All three of the sonatas and the brass quintet from the recording have received reviews in international journals as prominent literature for saxophone, clarinet, trombone and brass ensemble.

== Reception ==
Professional ratings
Review scores
Source	Rating
Fanfare Magazine	(very positive)
American Record Guide	(positive)
emusic	3/5 stars
WRUV	(positive)
The Horn Call	(lukewarm/positive)
ICA, The Clarinet	(very positive)
Saxophone Journal	(very positive)
ITEA Journal	(very positive)

"...the purpose of this (recording) is to broaden the stylistic range of concert chamber music; a breaking-down of barriers...Collectors wishing to savor jazz served in classical mugs will find this an interesting release."

Ronald E. Grames, Fanfare Magazine

"Most enjoyable...are the two woodwind sonatas...The outer movements are lively and full of improvisatory exuberence, the (slow movement) allows (Paul) Haar to show his contemplative side. In the Clarinet Sonata, Cedric Mayfield's high-register tone is never shrill, and his playing is impressive in both noted and improvised music."

Barry Kilpatrick, American Record Guide

"...of all of the compositions on this CD I most enjoyed One of the Missing (for those lost in Iraq), is soulfully performed by John Mueller on euphonium. To me, it had the most musical depth and expressive qualities."

Calvin Smith, The Horn Call

"...an engaging musical experience in the hands of these performers, who are stylistically so attuned to this music and so in command of their instruments."

William Nichols, ICA Journal/The Clarinet

"...Haar's recording of this piece on The Chamber Wind Music of Jack Cooper (Centaur Records) is very impressive and would be a great example for any younger player learning the piece."

David Demsey, Saxophone Journal

"The playing of all involved is terrific (check out Luis Bonilla on the Sonata for Trombone), and the music is accessible but different. If you would like to hear some contemporary wind chamber music with a good dose of jazz influence, then this CD fits the bill."

Roy Couch, ITEA Journal

== Track listing ==
All tracks are written by Jack Cooper.

No.	Title	Length
1.	"Sonata for Trombone, Mov. I - Mambo"	2:56
2.	"Mov. II - Solo"	4:57
3.	"Mov. III - Afro Latin in 12/8"	4:44
4.	"Sonata for Alto Saxophone, Mov. I - Latin 12/8, swing"	5:10
5.	"Mov. II - Slow/faster/slow"	3:10
6.	"Mov. III - Up Tempo, a la Tristano"	3:45
7.	"Five Scenes for Brass Quintet, Mov. I - Fanfare"	1:35
8.	"Mov. II - Somberly"	5:04
9.	"Mov. III - Fugue"	2:12
10.	"Mov. IV - Shapes, Forms, Shadows"	4:17
11.	"Mov. V - Afro-Latin"	3:58
12.	"Sonata for Clarinet, Mov. I - Latin 9/8"	5:10
13.	"Mov. II - a la Satie"	3:10
14.	"Mov. III - Presto"	3:45
15.	"One of the Missing (for those lost in Iraq)"	5:18
Total length:		63:30

== Recording sessions ==
- November 13, 2007
- March 17, December 19, 2008
- March 9 and 17, June 2, 2009
- all tracks recorded in Harris Concert Hall, the University of Memphis School of Music

== Personnel ==
=== Musicians ===
- Composer, conductor: Jack Cooper
- Trombone: Luis Bonilla
- Alto Saxophone: Paul Haar
- Clarinet: Cedric Mayfield
- Trumpet: David Spencer
- Trumpet: Ben Lewis
- Horn: Daniel Phillips
- Trombone and Euphonium: John Mueller
- Tuba: Kevin Sanders
- Piano: Chris Parker
- Piano: Oksana Poleshook
- Latin Percussion: Pablo Bilbraut
- Drums (set): Michael Waldrop

=== Production ===
- Recording engineer, mixing, and mastering: Jonathan Frazer
- Piano Technicians: Scott Higgins and Richard Boyington
- Liner Notes: Jack Cooper and Ken Kreitner
- Cover art: Cathy Cooper
- Photographer: Rene Koopman

== See also ==
- Luis Bonilla
- Michael Waldrop
- Sonata for Trombone (Cooper)
- Works for saxophone and piano
- Clarinet sonata
- Brass quintet repertoire
- Euphonium repertoire
