= Robert Suderburg =

American composer

Robert Charles Suderburg (28 January 1936 in Spencer, Iowa – 22 April 2013 in Williamstown, Massachusetts) was an American composer, conductor, and pianist.

== Biography ==
The son of a jazz trombonist, Suderburg studied composition with Paul Fetler at the University of Minnesota, where he received a BA in 1957. He did post-graduate studies with Richard Donovan at Yale University (MM 1960), and with George Rochberg at the University of Pennsylvania, where he received his PhD in 1966 with a dissertation, "Tonal Cohesion in Schoenberg's Twelve-tone Music".

After teaching at Bryn Mawr College, the Philadelphia Academy of Music, and the University of Pennsylvania, in 1966 he was appointed professor at the University of Washington in Seattle, where he also became associate director of the University of Washington's Contemporary Group, and taught there until 1974. From 1974 to 1984 he was chancellor of the North Carolina School of the Arts, and in 1985 joined the music faculty of Williams College in Williamstown, Massachusetts. He served as chair of the department from 1986 to 1995. In 1994 he was appointed to a named chair, and continued to teach until his retirement in 2001.

Suderburg's compositions have been published by Theodore Presser and performed nationally and internationally by major orchestras, ensembles, and solo artists, including the Philadelphia Orchestra, the Seattle and North Carolina symphonies, and the Philadelphia String Quartet. His works and performances have been recorded by Columbia, Vox and Delfon, among others. Suderburg taught music at Williams College beginning in 1985, became composer-in-residence there in 1986, and served as Chair of the Music Department from 1986 to 1995. He retired in 2001. Suderburg conducted and taught at Bryn Mawr, the Philadelphia Musical Academy, the University of Pennsylvania, and the City University of New York. He also served as Co-director of the Contemporary Group at the University of Washington (1966–74), and President of the Cornish Institute in Seattle (1984–85). He served on many boards and panels, including the National Endowment for the Arts (NEA) Composers Panel from 1975 to 1981. He received fellowships, awards, and prizes including two Guggenheim Fellowships, two NEA Fellowships, numerous ASCAP awards, awards from the Rockefeller Foundation and the American Music Center, the USIA award, and others.

== Musical style ==
Suderburg's earlier compositions were serial, but in the late 1960s he abandoned twelve-tone technique and turned to a highly personal, lyrical, basically neoromantic style. His musical language is largely modal, with Phrygian and Lydian predominating, and occasionally adopts scale patterns characteristic of non-Western traditions, such as those of Japanese koto music. Rising major sevenths and minor ninths are favoured melodic intervals, and his harmonies frequently feature sounds derived from the major-seventh and major-seventh with added fourth chords. He tends to use moderate to slow underlying tempos, but with active and pliable surface rhythms, suggesting improvisation.

== Compositions (selective list) ==
- Concert Mass, for SATB choir (1960)
- Six Moments, for piano (1962)
- Cantata I (text: Revelations), for soprano and chamber orchestra (1963)
- Cantata II (text by the composer), for tenor and chamber orchestra (1964)
- Composition on Traditional Carols, SATB choir, congregation, brass choir (1965)
- Choruses on Poems of Yeats, soprano, tenor, SATB choir, and chamber orchestra (1966)
- Chamber Music I ("Entertainments"), for violin and cello (1967)
- Chamber Music II ("Dramatic Entertainments"), for string quartet (1967)
- Orchestra Music I (1969)
- Show, for child actor and orchestra (1970)
- Solo Music I, for violin (1971)
- Chamber Music III ("Night Set"), for trombone and piano (1972)
- Winds/Vents, for orchestra (1973)
- Concerto, Within the Mirror of Time, for piano and orchestra (1974)
- Chamber Music IV ("Ritual Series"), for percussion ensemble (1975)
- Chamber Music V ("Stevenson"), for solo voice, string quartet, and tape (1976)
- Percussion Concerto (1977)
- Voyage de nuit, concerto after Baudelaire, for solo voice and chamber orchestra (1978)
- Chamber Music VI ("Three Movements"), for violin and double bass (1980)
- Harp Concerto (1982, rev. 1989)
- Chamber Music VII ("Ceremonies"), for trumpet and piano (1984)
- Chamber Music VIII (Sonata for trumpet and piano) (1988)
- Solo Music II ("Ritual Cycle of Lyrics and Dances"), for viola (1989)
- Chamber Music IX ("Breath and Circuses"), for voice, trombone, and piano (1991)
- Chamber Music X ("Entertainment Sets"), for brass quintet (1992)
- Chamber Music XI ("Strophes of Night and Dawn after Baudelaire"), for brass quintet (1992)
- Ceremonial Music, for brass quintet (1993)
- Fanfare for Bowdoin, for brass quintet (1993)
- Solo Music III ("Bill at Colonus"), for clarinet (1997)
- Five Songs (Amerindian texts), for solo voice, children’s chorus, and piano (1997)
- Chamber Music XII ("Concerto Passages"), for brass quintet (1998)

== Discography ==
- Chamber Music II ("Dramatic Entertainments for String Quartet"). Philadelphia String Quartet. The Contemporary Composer in the USA. [U.S.]: Turnabout, 1974. LP, TV-S 34524. With George Rochberg: String Quartet No. 2.
- Chamber Music III ("Night Set"), for trombone and piano; Chamber Music IV ("Ritual Series"), for percussion ensemble; Chamber music V ("Stevenson"), for voice, string quartet, and tape. Stuart Dempster, trombone; Robert Suderburg, piano; Elizabeth Suderburg, soprano; Ciompi String Quartet; University of Michigan Percussion Ensemble, cond. Charles Owen. Newark, N.J.: Delfcon Recording Society, 1990. CD, DRS 2127.
- Chamber Music III ("Night Set") for trombone and piano. Blues, Ballads and Beyond. Mark Hetzler, trombone;. Summit Records DCD 668, 2015.
- Chamber music IV ("Ritual Series"). First Construction. Winthrop University Percussion Ensemble, cond. Adam Snow. [Rock Hill, S.C.]: Eagle Editions, 2002. CD. With works by Ronald Lo Presti, John Cage, Bob Becker, Camille Saint-Saëns, Charles Gounod, Manuel de Falla, and David Rose.
- Chamber Music VII ("Ceremonies"), for trumpet and piano. Mixed Doubles. Michael Hilton Tunnell, trumpet; Meme Tunnell, piano. Columbus, Ohio: Coronet, 1990. LP, LPS 3210. With works by Donald H. White, David Liptak.
- Chamber Music VII ("Ceremonies", and Chamber Music VIII (Sonata for trumpet in C and piano). Trumpet Works. Charles Schlueter, trumpet; Deborah DeWolf Emery, piano. White Plains, N.Y.: Kleos Classics, 2003. CD, KL5126. With Jean Hubeau, Sonata for trumpet and piano; Paul Hindemith, Sonata for trumpet and piano.
- Chamber Music VII ("Ceremonies"), for trumpet and piano. The International Trumpet Guild Presents Terry Everson. Terry Everson, trumpet; Susan Nowicki, piano. International Trumpet Guild. CD, ITG 001. Issued with the Journal of the International Trumpet Guild 16, no. 1 (1991). With works by Peter Maxwell Davies, Robert Henderson, Jacques Castérède, Fisher Tull, and Aaron Copland.
- Chamber Music VII: ("Ceremonies"), and Chamber Music VIII (Sonata for trumpet in C and piano). Bravura Trumpet. Charles Schlueter, trumpet; Robert Suderburg, piano. Englewood Cliffs, NJ : Vox Classics, 1995. CD, VOX 7513.
- Chamber Music VIII (Sonata for trumpet in C and piano). Parable. Terry Everson, trumpet; Susan Nowicki, piano. Heerenveen, Holland: De Haske Classical, 1997. CD, DHR 197.006. With music by Joseph Turrin, Norman Dello Joio, Vincent Persichetti, Jan Krzywicki, and Augusta Read Thomas.
- Chamber Music XI ("Strophes of Night and Dawn after Baudelaire"), for brass quintet. Strophes of the Night and Dawn. Florida State Brass Quintet. Camus, WA: Crystal Records, 1997. CD, 566. With music by J. S. Bach, Richard Peaslee, John Cheetham, Gwyneth Walker, Steven Everett, and Jan Koetsier.
- Concerto Within the Mirror of Time, for piano and orchestra. Béla Siki, piano; Seattle Symphony Orchestra, cond. Milton Katims. New York: Odyssey, 1976. LP, Y 34140. With William Schuman: Symphony no. 8.
- “Sanctus”, from the Concert Mass. Portland State University Chamber Choir, cond. Bruce Brown. Albany Records. CD, TROY 243. With works by Bryan Johanson, Tomas Svoboda, Salvador Brotons, Vijay Singh, and Norman Dinerstein. Reissued online, New York: DRAM, 2007. Streaming audio, TR243. (Subscription access)
- Solo Music I, for unaccompanied violin, and Solo music II: Ritual Cycle of Lyrics and Dance, for unaccompanied viola. 20th Century Bravura Chamber Music. Elizabeth Suderburg, soprano; Timothy Baker, violin; Donald McInnes, viola; Russell Miller, piano. Pleasantville, N.Y.: Kleos Classics, 2000. CD, KL 5106. With Charles Martin Loeffler: Quatre poèmes, for voice, viola and piano, op. 5; Paul Hindemith: Sonata for viola and piano, op. 11 no. 4.
- Voyage de nuit (Concerto d'après Baudelaire). Elizabeth Suderburg, soprano; Piedmont Chamber Orchestra, cond. Nicholas Harsanyi. Turnabout, 1981. LP, TV 34776. With Benjamin Britten: Les illuminations, op. 18.

== Sources ==
- Anon. 2001. "Five Williams College Faculty Retire". Williams College press release.
- Anon. 2013. "In Memoriam: Dr. Robert Suderburg". University of North Carolina School of the Arts website (Accessed June 20, 2013).
- Carlsen, Philip. 2001. "Suderburg, Robert". The New Grove Dictionary of Music and Musicians, second edition, edited by Stanley Sadie and John Tyrrell. London: Macmillan Publishers.
- Clarke, Henry Leland. 1967. "Current Chronicle: United States: Seattle". Musical Quarterly 53, no. 3 (July): 397–400.
- Richardson, William. 1984. [untitled review], MLA Notes second series, 40, No. 4 (June): 884–85.
- Whitaker, Lauren. 2013. "Robert Suderburg, Third Chancellor of UNCSA, Has Died: Campus Mourns Second Loss This Month of a Former Leader". University of North Carolina School of the Arts website (Accessed June 20, 2013).
