= John D. Stevens =

American composer

John D. Stevens (born 1951) is an American composer/arranger, tubist, and brass pedagogue. He performs with the Wisconsin Brass Quintet, the brass chamber ensemble in residence at the University of Wisconsin–Madison.

Stevens' compositions include several major works for the tuba, including Journey, Power, Moondance, City Suite, Dances, Manhattan Suite, Triumph of the Demon Gods, Suite for Two and a Euphonium Concerto and Sonata. Many of his compositions are published by Swiss music publisher Editions-BIM. His compositional style ranges from rock and jazz to modern through-composed music. In 1997 he was commissioned by the Chicago Symphony Orchestra to write a tuba concerto. His work is also featured on the Mark Hetzler 2015 recording Blues, Ballads and Beyond.

An accomplished performer, Stevens was the original sousaphone soloist in the Broadway production Barnum and is a member of Symphonia, the world's first professional tuba ensemble.

== Sources ==
- Classics on Line biography of John D. Stevens
