= Bob Snyder (musician) =

American musician

- Born: August 11, 1936; Danville, Indiana
- Died: August 28, 2019 (aged 83); Graceville, Florida
- Occupation: Musician
- Known for: Tenor sax, Alto sax, Clarinet, and Flute

Bob Snyder (August 11, 1936 – August 28, 2019) was an American musician known for playing tenor sax, alto sax, clarinet, and flute. He performed with The Airmen of Note, the Glenn Miller Air Force Dance Band, and Lionel Hampton. He also served as staff musician for Motown Records, Stax Records, and WJR radio. He made a very popular clarinet recording of the song "Amazing Grace" at the Grand Hotel (Mackinac Island) on Mackinac Island, Michigan.

Dick Johnson, when in charge of the Artie Shaw Orchestra, said Snyder was the best musician playing at the time.

== Early life ==
Bob Snyder was born in Danville, Indiana on August 11, 1936. His parents were both musicians; his father led an Air Force band. He played professionally for the first time when he was eight years old. When he was ten, he played with "The Hillbilly Kids", a family group.

At eleven, Snyder played clarinet with the Hoosier Symphony at Canterbury College in Danville. At thirteen, Snyder appeared on Horace Heidt Amateur Hour in Terre Haute and by age fourteen he became a featured player with the Indiana State Legion Band.

While in high school, Snyder won the All State Indiana Music Contest for four years in a row. Snyder graduated from Danville High School in 1954 and spent a semester at Butler University.

Snyder spent eight years in the Marine Reserves, where he played with the band, and he became one of the original members of the Air Force VIP Band. He later toured with The Airmen of Note and with Glenn Miller's Air Force Dance Band.

== Professional career ==
Snyder played with the Tommy Dorsey and Ted Weems orchestras, and later played with the band at the Sands Hotel and Casino in Las Vegas, including backing Frank Sinatra. He also played at Al Hirt's club in New Orleans. Snyder played with Memphis Horns at Stax Records in Memphis and in Detroit with the Motown Recording Orchestra and WJR. As a studio musician he played with Branford Marsalis, Count Basie, Marvin Gaye, Dave Brubeck, Johnny Mathis, Otis Redding, The Jackson Five, Tito Puente, Diana Ross, The Temptations, Mickey Gilley and Red Sovine. Songs he appeared on included "The Tears of a Clown" by Smokey Robinson, "You Are the Sunshine of My Life" by Stevie Wonder, "Knock on Wood" by Eddie Floyd and "Soul Man" by Sam and Dave. He also performed music for the movie Dead Presidents and the TV series The X-Files.

In 1971 Lionel Hampton asked Snyder to join his orchestra, and they toured Europe, including countries under Communism. Hampton said, "I consider Bob Snyder the best clarinet player in the world."

In the early 1980s Snyder played with Bobby Gideon's band at the Marco Lodge, and he bought a home in Goodland, Florida, keeping it until he moved to Marco Island, Florida permanently.

In 1984, Snyder became music director of the Grand Hotel on Mackinac Island, Michigan. During his 15 years there he recorded ten CDs, including Showtime At The Grand, An Evening At The Grand -- Volumes 1 & 2 and Sunday At The Grand. Joe Lacina's national radio show Saturday Night Dance Party aired performances from Snyder's shows. After retiring from that job, he began touring the United States, mostly performing in churches. He continued to appear at the Grand Hotel twice a year, and he began running his own nightclub in Marco Island.

Snyder also started his own record label Saxy Records, which sold his records as well as records by others.

Jim Beal Jr. of the San Antonio Express-News said Snyder "can swing with the best and then touch the flint-hearted" with "Amazing Grace". He also said Snyder "moves easily from New Orleans jazz standards to Artie Shaw classics, from Christmas carols to spirituals, all without missing a beat or finding anything strange about the varied repertoire."

== "Amazing Grace" ==
While performing at the Grand Hotel on Mackinac Island, Snyder normally played "Amazing Grace" on the saxophone. In 1988, after playing more than twenty songs, Snyder thought he and his band were through for the night but hotel co-owner Amelia Musser had requested the song. Snyder discovered his reed was broken, and he changed to the clarinet. His wife Jan said, "He had never played that arrangement before." The performance was recorded and appeared on his CD An Evening at the Grand, Vol. 1, though he had not planned to include it until his wife Jan suggested it. Eddie Hubbard played the record on his Stardust radio network program, distributed by ABC Radio Networks. Soon, lots of people were calling, wanting to know how they could buy that recording. Ten years later, Snyder said, "It's mushroomed ever since. The response is still phenomenal. It's almost eerie." Pat Boone called it "the most beautiful recording he has ever heard." Snyder was considering retirement because of diabetes but changed his mind, and started taking better care of himself.

Because of the recording, Joe Lacina started playing Snyder's music on his Dance Party show on Stardust radio network.

As of 2000, 1500 radio stations, including gospel and jazz, were playing the record regularly. As of June 2004, the recording had sold one million copies.

== Post-retirement ==
As of 2011, Snyder lived in Graceville, Florida with his wife Jan. He reportedly played with the Baptist College of Florida Jazz Band and served as assistant band director at Holmes County High School. He also performed with a group of students from Graceville, Marianna, and many other cities called The Piano Road Band.

Snyder became Honorary Mayor of San Antonio, Texas when he visited and performed for injured military troops.

Snyder was also named to Danville High School's Alumni Hall of Fame. The first Bob and Jan Snyder Achievement Award, for a clarinet or saxophone player, was given June 14, 2008.

Snyder died on August 28, 2019.
