= Michael Colgrass =

American and Canadian composer

- Born: April 22, 1932; Brookfield, Illinois
- Died: July 2, 2019 (aged 87); Toronto, Ontario, Canada
- Education: University of Illinois
- Occupation: Composer
- Notable work: Déjà vu Crossworlds
- Awards: Guggenheim Fellowship (1964, 1967); Pulitzer Prize for Music (1978); Emmy Award (1982)
- Website: www.michaelcolgrass.com

Michael Charles Colgrass (April 22, 1932 – July 2, 2019) was an American and Canadian musician, composer, and educator. He was an associate composer of the Canadian Music Centre.

== Early life and education ==
Colgrass was born in Brookfield, Illinois, a suburb of Chicago. His musical career began in Chicago as a jazz musician (1944–1949). He graduated from the University of Illinois (1954) with a degree in percussion performance and composition, including studies with Darius Milhaud at the Aspen Festival and Lukas Foss at Tanglewood. He served two years as timpanist in the U.S. Seventh Army Symphony in Stuttgart.

== Career ==
Colgrass spent eleven years supporting his composition activities as a free-lance percussionist in the city of New York, where his performance experiences included such varied groups as the New York Philharmonic Orchestra, The Metropolitan Opera, Dizzy Gillespie, the Modern Jazz Recording Orchestra's Stravinsky Conducts Stravinsky series, and numerous ballet, opera, and jazz ensembles. He organized the percussion sections for Gunther Schuller's recordings and concerts, as well as for recordings and premieres of new works by John Cage, Elliott Carter, Edgard Varèse, and Harry Partch; and he performed with Partch's ensemble. During his New York period, he continued to study composition with Wallingford Riegger (1958) and Ben Weber (1958–1960).

Colgrass received commissions from the New York Philharmonic and The Boston Symphony (twice), as well as the orchestras of Minnesota, Detroit, San Francisco, St. Louis, Pittsburgh, Washington, Toronto (twice), the National Arts Centre Orchestra (twice), The Canadian Broadcasting Corporation, the Lincoln Center Chamber Music Society, the Manhattan and Muir String Quartets, the Brighton Festival in England, the Fromm and Ford Foundations, the Corporation for Public Broadcasting, and numerous other orchestras, chamber groups, choral groups, and soloists.

The Colgrass family decided to relocate to Toronto in 1970 primarily because of street crime, labor strikes, and civil chaos then rampant in the city of New York, an urban quality-of-life crisis that reached its peak under Mayor John Vliet Lindsay. "Crime was at its apex at the time in New York and Ulla and I were wondering where to live," Colgrass later told a Toronto journalist. "We … happened to see a 60 Minutes special on Toronto, with its low crime rate, multiculturalism, and plenty of parks. We liked what we saw." The move would break Colgrass's life roughly into two parts: an American half followed by a Canadian half.

Colgrass won the 1978 Pulitzer Prize for Music for his symphonic piece Déjà vu, which was commissioned and premiered by the New York Philharmonic. In addition, he received an Emmy Award in 1982 for a PBS documentary Soundings: The Music of Michael Colgrass. Other awards include two Guggenheim Fellowships, a Rockefeller Grant, First Prize in the Barlow and Sudler International Wind Ensemble Competitions, and the 1988 Jules Léger Prize for New Chamber Music.

Among his later works is Crossworlds (2002) for flute, piano, and orchestra; this was commissioned by the Boston Symphony Orchestra and premiered with soloists Marina Piccinini and Andreas Heafliger. In 2003 he conducted the premiere of his new chamber orchestra version of the Bach-Goldberg Variations with members of the Toronto Symphony Orchestra. Another twenty-first century premiere was Side by Side (2007) for harpsichord, altered piano (one player), and orchestra, commissioned collectively by the Esprit Orchestra, The Boston Modern Orchestra Project, and The Richmond Symphony featuring soloist Joanne Kong. The Canadian premiere took place on 13 May 2007 in Toronto under conductor Alex Pauk; the American premiere followed on 2 November 2007 in Boston under Gil Rose. Soon after followed Pan Trio, for steel drums, harp, and percussion (marimba/vibraphone), commissioned and premiered in Toronto on 21 May 2008 by Soundstreams Canada and featuring pans virtuoso Liam Teague. His work was also featured on the Mark Hetzler 2015 recording Blues, Ballads and Beyond.

Colgrass also devised a system of teaching music creativity to children; he taught this to middle- and high-school music teachers, who have in turn used his techniques to teach children to write and perform new music of their own creation. His articles on these activities appeared in the Music Educators Journal (September 2004) and Adultita, an Italian education magazine. He also wrote a number of works for children to perform.

== Personal life and death ==
Colgrass lived in Toronto, Ontario, Canada for nearly five decades, while earning his living internationally as a composer.

Colgrass died on July 2, 2019, at the age of 87. His widow, Ulla, is a journalist and editor who writes about music and the arts; and his son Neal is an editor, journalist, and screenwriter.

== Notable students ==
- John Bergamo

== Works ==
=== Books ===
As a prose author, Colgrass wrote My Lessons with Kumi, a fictionalized "teaching tale" outlining his techniques for performance and creativity; he also gave workshops throughout the world on the psychology and technique of performance. Colgrass also wrote, in collaboration with his wife and son, Adventures of an American Composer: An Autobiography, published in 2010.

- Colgrass, Michael (2000). My Lessons With Kumi: How I Learned to Perform with Confidence in Life and Work. Boulder, Colorado: Real People Press/Andreas NLP. ISBN 978-0-911226-40-9.
- Colgrass, Michael (2010). Colgrass, Neal and Ulla (ed.). Adventures of an American Composer: An Autobiography. Galesville, Maryland: Meredith Music. ISBN 978-1-57463-155-5.

=== Music ===
The following is a list of works by Colgrass.

Solo Compositions

- Mystic with a Credit Card (1978) 6'30"
- Tales of Power(1980) 24'
- Te Tuma Te Papa (1994) 12'
- Wild Riot of the Shaman's Dreams (1992) 8'
- Wolf (1976) 17'

Songs

- Mystery Flowers of Spring (1985) 4'
- New People (1969) 18'
- Night of the Raccoon (1979) 14'

Chamber music

- Flashbacks A Musical Play (1979) 35'
- A Flute in the Kingdom of Drums and Bells(1994) 35'
- Folklines: A Counterpoint of Musics for String Quartet (1988) 22'
- Hammer & Bow (1997) 10'
- Light Spirit (1963) 8'
- Memento (1982) 16'
- Pan Trio (2008)
- Rhapsody (1962) 8'
- Strangers: Irreconcilable Variations for Clarinet, Viola and Piano (1986) 24'
- Variations for Four Drums and Viola (1957) 17'
- Wind Quintet (1962) 8'

Orchestra

- As Quiet As (1966) 14'
- Bach-Goldberg Variations 30'
- Ghosts of Pangea (2002) 22'
- Letter From Mozart (1976) 16'
- The Schubert Birds (1989) 18'

Soloist and Orchestra

- Arias (1992) 26'
- Auras (1972) 15'
- Chaconne (1984) 26'
- Concertmasters (1974) 22'
- Crossworlds (2002) 32'
- Deja vu (1977) 18'
- Delta (1979) 20'
- Memento (1982) 16'
- Rhapsodic Fantasy (1964) 8'
- Side by Side (2007) 22'
- Snow Walker for Organ and Orchestra (1990) 20'

Chorus and orchestra

- Best Wishes USA (1976) 34'
- Theater of the Universe (1972) 18'
- Image of Man (1974) 20'
- The Earth's A Baked Apple (1969) 10'

Wind Ensemble

- Arctic Dreams (1991) 24'
- Dream Dancer (2001) 22'
- Raag Mala (2005) 14’
- Urban Requiem for Saxophone Quartet and Wind Ensemble (1995) 28'
- Winds of Nagual (1985): A Musical Fable on the Writings of Carlos Castaneda (1985) 25'

Young Band

- Apache Lullaby (2003) 4'45"
- Bali (2005) 8’
- The Beethoven Machine (2003) 6'
- Gotta Make Noise (2003) 3'30"-45'
- Old Churches (2000) 5'30"

Musical Theatre

- Something's Gonna Happen (1978) 45'
- Virgil's Dream (1967) 35'

Percussion Music

- Chamber Music for Percussion Quintet (1954) 5'
- Concertino for Timpani (1953) 10'
- Fantasy Variations (1961) 12'
- Inventions on a Motive (1955) 8'
- Percussion Music (1953) 5'
- Three Brothers (1951) 4'
- Variations for Four Drums and Viola (1957) 17'
