= Blues, Ballads and Beyond =

Blues, Ballads and Beyond: Influences Outside the Concert Hall

Studio album by Mark Hetzler
- Released: November 6, 2015
- Recorded: 2012/2013, Mills Concert Hall, University of Wisconsin–Madison, Madison, Wisconsin 2011-2013
- Genre: Classical, Chamber Music, New Music, instrumental, Jazz
- Length: 1:18:49
- Label: Summit Records
- Producer: Mark Hetzler

Mark Hetzler chronology
THEY SAID... (2014)	Blues, Ballads and Beyond: Influences Outside the Concert Hall (2015)	Dig (2016)
- cat. #, Summit Records DCD 668

Blues, Ballads and Beyond is the tenth classical/new music studio album from trombonist Mark Hetzler on the Summit Records label. It was critically acclaimed by Classical Musical Sentinel, "He can shape, flex, caress, torture, stress, accent and animate notes on the fly and bring anything he plays to life. All the pieces on this new CD were well chosen to showcase his command of the instrument, and the range of styles he easily slips into is impressive" Numerous prominent performing artists and composers are featured on the recording to include Michael Colgrass, Enrique Crespo, Daniel Schnyder, Robert Suderburg, John Stevens, and Jack Cooper.

== Background ==
Blues, Ballads and Beyond features jazz and commercially influenced music by contemporary classical composers. The list of composers for the recording is diverse and to include Michael Colgrass, Enrique Crespo, Daniel Schnyder, Robert Suderburg, John Stevens, and Jack Cooper. American Record Guide is quoted to say Mark Hetzler is “..one of the world’s great trombone players” and the recording helps to demonstrate his prowess on the instrument. Much like his past recordings with Summit Records, this recording has a wide range of musical influences and was completed in numerous recording sessions throughout 2011-2013.

== Track listing ==
All tracks are written by noted.

No.	Title	Writer(s)	Length
1.	"Mystic with a Credit Card"	Michael Colgrass	7:15
2.	"Javier's Dialog"	Dennis Llinás	6:37
3.	"Improvisation No. 1"	Enrique Crespo	6:25
4.	"Sonata for Trombone and Piano, Mov. I - Blues"	Daniel Schnyder	6:20
5.	"Sonata for Trombone and Piano, Mov. II - An American Ballad"		4:18
6.	"Sonata for Trombone and Piano, Mov. III - Below Surface"		1:39
7.	"Night Set for Trombone and Piano: Mov I. Cry, Man"	Robert Suderburg	3:09
8.	"Night Set for Trombone and Piano: Mov II. It's Been A Long, Long Time"		6:46
9.	"Night Set for Trombone and Piano: Mov III. Brother Devil"		5:42
10.	"Doolallynastics"	Brian Lynn	8:45
11.	"Melancholy Mood"	John Stevens	7:38
12.	"Sonata: Mov. I Mambo"	Jack Cooper	3:06
13.	"Sonata: Mov. II Solo"		4:48
14.	"Sonata: Mov. III Naningo"		6:23

== Recording Sessions ==
- Throughout 2013/2014
- all tracks recorded at Mills Concert Hall, the University of Wisconsin–Madison

== Personnel ==
=== Musicians ===
- Trombone: Mark Hetzler
- Percussion: Anthony Di Sanza
- Marimba: Sean Kleve
- Vibraphone: Brett Walter
- Vibraphone: Joseph Murfin
- Piano/keyboards: Vincent Fuh
- Piano: Marthe Fischer
- Narration: Buss Kemper
- Bass: Nick Moran
- Drums (set): Todd Hammes
- Congas: Yorel Lashley

=== Production ===
- Producer, conductor, engineer: Mark Hetzler
- Digital Mastering: Bob Katz at Digital Domain
- Liner Notes: Michael Colgrass, Dennis Llinás, Mark Hetzler, Daniel Schnyder, Robert Suderburg, Brian Lynn, John Stevens, Jack Cooper
- Cover art and design: Daniel Traynor
- Photography: Katrin Talbot

== Reception ==
Professional ratings
Review scores
Source	Rating
Classical Music Sentinel	Highly favorable
All About Jazz	#2 of Top 25 "Recommended" Album Reviews; 2016
ITA Journal	Highly favorable

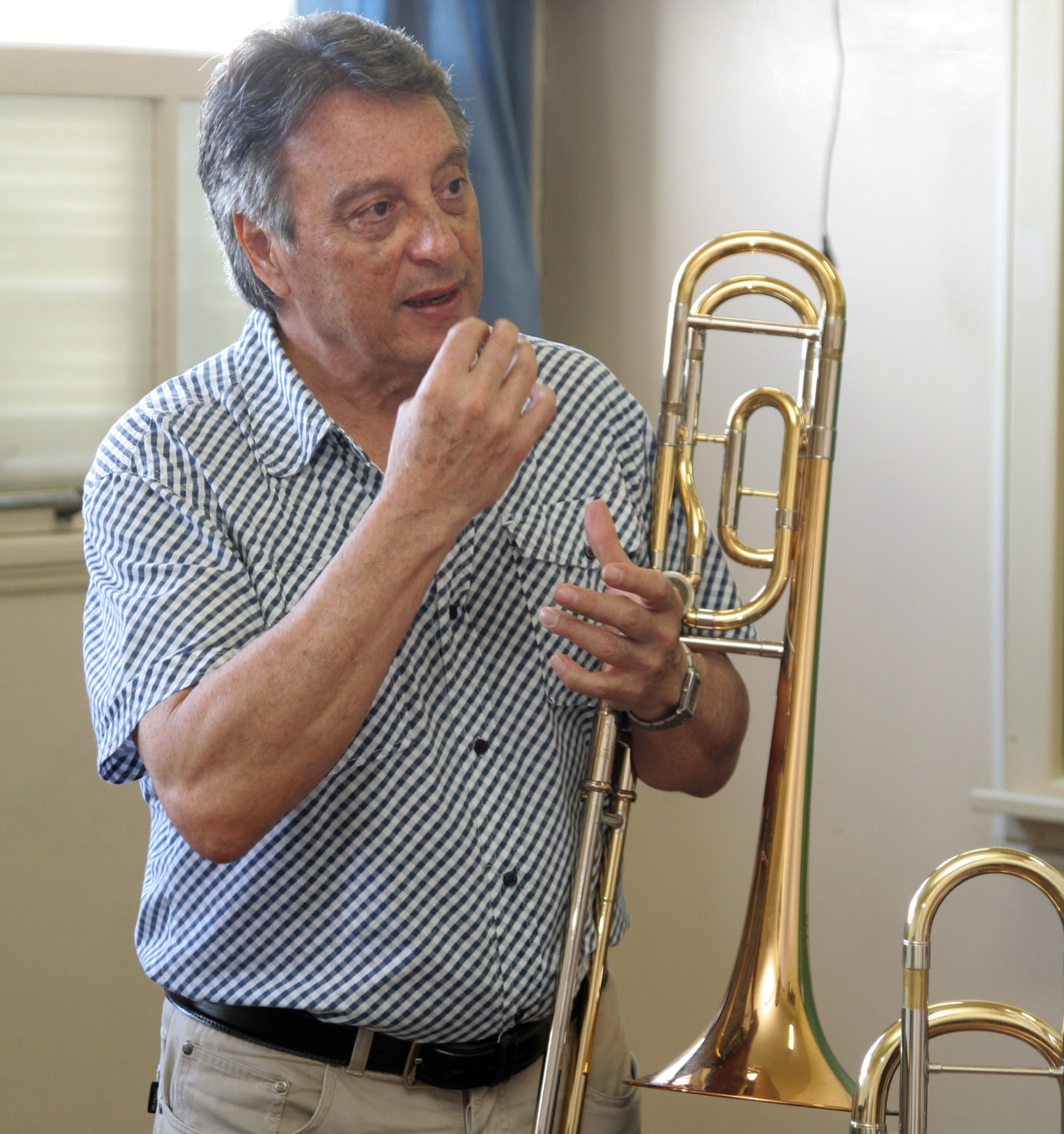
"Improvisation No. 1" composed by internationally known artist/composer Enrique Crespo is featured on Blues, Ballads and Beyond

"Mind boggling is how well he plays the trombone...Unbelievable! Remarkable playing. What being a true musician is all about."

Jean-Yves Duperron - Classical Music Sentinel

"Trombonist Mark Hetzler has assembled a collection of contemporary trombone compositions that brighten the light on this often ill-considered instrument on his Blues, Ballads, and Beyond: Influences Outside the Concert Hall."

C. Michael Bailey - All About Jazz

"Listeners seeking excellent interpretations of the familiar works on this album with find it. Those seeking newer works with influences beyond the concert hall will be even better served by this album."

Jeremy Kolwinska - ITA Journal

== Release history ==
Region	Date	Label	Format
Canada	November 6, 2015	Summit Records	CD, digital download
United Kingdom	November 6, 2015	Summit Records	CD, digital download
United States	November 6, 2015	Summit Records	CD, digital download
Japan	November 10, 2015	Summit Records	CD, digital download
Europe (Germany)	November 19, 2015	Summit Records	CD, digital download

== See also ==
- Mark Hetzler
- Empire Brass
- Michael Colgrass
- Enrique Crespo
- Daniel Schnyder
- Robert Suderburg
- John Stevens
- Jack Cooper
