= Atlantic Brass Quintet =

The Atlantic Brass Quintet is an American brass quintet that has been in existence for over 30 years.

Founded in 1985 by John Manning, Joseph Foley, John Faieta, Tsuyoshi Taramotoi, and Bob Rasmussen, the quintet has won Grand prizes at the Coleman Chamber Music Competition, Carmel Chamber Music Society Competition, the Shoreline Alliance Chamber Music Competition, the Summit Brass First International Brass Ensemble Competition, and the Rafael Mendez International Brass Quintet Competition. The group was named "Young Artists of 1988" by Musical America. In May 1992, by unanimous decision, the Quintet won the "Premiere Prix" at the International Brass Competition of Narbonne, France.

The quintet has performed at Carnegie Hall, Weill Recital Hall, the Santa Fe Chamber Music Festival, the Fleet Boston Celebrity Series, Tanglewood, and the White House, and has been the resident brass quintet of Boston University, the Boston University Tanglewood Institute, and the Boston Conservatory.

The quintet hosts the Atlantic Brass Quintet Summer Seminar each year. Established in 1993, the Summer Seminar is a 2-week immersive brass quintet camp with 55 participants (ranging from high school through college, post-grad, pre-professional, and adults) and 10 faculty, including the members of the Atlantic and Triton brass quintets.

Members of the group have, and continue to compose and arrange music for brass quintet. Many of these compositions and arrangements are published by the Atlantic Brass Quintet and sold on the group's website.

The current members of the Atlantic Brass Quintet are Thomas Bergeron and Andrew Sorg, trumpets; Seth Orgel, French Horn; Timothy Albright, trombone; and John Manning, tuba.

The group's touring repertoire is known for its diverse stylistic influences, including baroque and classical/romanic transcriptions, jazz arrangements, and traditional Balkan brass music.

== Discography ==
- Quintet Matinee (2015)

Atlantic Brass Quintet, University of Connecticut Wind Ensembles & Jeffrey H. Henshaw

- Crossover (2014)

Atlantic Brass Quintet, Summit Records DCD 625

- Fanfares and Passages (2006)

Atlantic Brass Quintet, Mark Custom Recordings 4247

- 5 Chairs (2005)

Atlantic Brass Quintet, Summit Records DCD 396

- Trumpets Sound, Voices Ring: A Joyous Christmas

Atlantic Brass Quintet and Other Artists, Musical Heritage Society 523153F

- A Musical Voyage (1995)

Atlantic Brass Quintet, Summit Records DCD 119

- Picture This: Artistic Transcriptions for Brass (2005)

Atlantic Brass Quintet, MusicMasters Classics 01612-67142-2

- All American Trombone: Ronald Barron

Atlantic Brass Quintet and Other Artists, Boston Brass Series BB1003

- Mostly Railroad Music: Eldon Rathburn

Atlantic Brass Quintet and Other Artists, Crystal Records CD520

- By George! Gershwin’s Greatest Hits (1993)

Atlantic Brass Quintet, MusicMasters Classics 01612-67104-2

- Atlantic Brass Quintet en Concert

Atlantic Brass Quintet, Disques FY et du Solstice SOCD 97
