= David Hickman (musician) =

American musician

David Hickman (June 19, 1950) is an American trumpeter, author, academic, and is widely considered one of the preeminent trumpet virtuosi of the 20th century. He is a Regents' Professor of trumpet at Arizona State University and past President of the International Trumpet Guild.

== Life and career ==
David Hickman received his Bachelor of Music degree at the University of Colorado in 1972. He continued graduate work at Wichita State University where he was a Graduate Trumpet Teaching Assistant for two years (1972–74). His primary teachers include Harry McNees, Frank Baird, and Walter Myers. He also studied with Dennis Schneider, Armando Ghitalla, Roger Voisin, Oswalt Lehnert, and Adolph Herseth. He taught at the University of Illinois from 1974 to 1982 and then taught at Arizona State University (1982 - 2019) becoming a Regents' Professor of Music in 1989. He has been a member of the Saint Louis Brass Quintet (11 yrs.), Wichita Brass Quintet (2 yrs.), Illinois Brass Quintet (8 yrs.), Baroque Consort, Summit Brass, and the Illinois Contemporary Chamber Players.

Hickman has released 19 solo albums encompassing a wide variety of repertoire – from cornet solos by Clarke, Levy, and others, to modern concerti by Planel, Baker, and Plog; from Baroque works of Bach, Telemann, and Hertel, to recital pieces by Chance, Dello Joio, and Méndez; from contemporary works to fun Christmas medleys. He is credited with presenting the first modern-day performance on keyed trumpet, performing the second and third movements of Joseph Haydn's Concerto for Trumpet in 1972.

As a noted clinician and author, Hickman has presented workshops on over 300 major university campuses. He has taught (13 summers) at the Banff Centre for the Arts (Canada), Bremen Trumpet Days (Germany), Rafael Méndez Brass Institute (36 summers), and dozens of music festivals. He has published over 40 articles and several important trumpet and music texts including The Piccolo Trumpet, The Piccolo Trumpet Big Book, Trumpet Lessons With David Hickman, Vols. 1–5, and Music Speed Reading, a sight-reading method widely used among instrumentalists. David Hickman is author of Trumpet Pedagogy: A Compendium of Modern Teaching Techniques and "Trumpet Greats: A Biographical Dictionary."

As an orchestral musician, Hickman performed as Principal Trumpet of the National Repertory Orchestra (1971 and 1972), Associate Principal of the Wichita Symphony (1972–1974), Principal of the Brevard Music Center Orchestra (1975), member, Tanglewood Fellowship Orchestra (1974), and Principal of the Champaign-Urbana Symphony (1974–80). He has also performed with the Saint Louis Symphony, Los Angeles Philharmonic, and the Phoenix Symphony Orchestra.

Hickman is founder and president of Summit Brass, a large all-star American brass ensemble dubbed by the press as the "Dream Team of Brass." Summit Brass has released 10 CDs, (many on the Summit Records label he helped establish), toured the world, and hosted the annual Rafael Méndez Brass Institute which has helped thousands of aspiring brass musicians. He served as president of the International Trumpet Guild from 1977 to 1979, and in 2005 received the International Trumpet Guild's prestigious Award of Merit. He was also awarded the ITG's Honorary Award in 2017, and is the only person to date to receive both of ITG's top awards.

== Discography ==
=== Solo ===
- Masterclass Series: Classical Trumpet (Summit, 2008)
- Masterclass Series: Baroque Trumpet (Summit, 2007)
- Trumpet Fiesta (with Arturo Sandoval, Wayne Bergeron, and others) (Summit, 2011
- A Cool Brassy Night at the North Pole (Summit, 1998)
- A Brassy Night at the Opera (Summit, 1997)
- David Hickman performs three trumpet concertos (Summit, 1997)
- Splendor and the Brass (Summit, 1997)
- Hope's Journey: The Music of Michael Conway Baker (Summit, 1995)
- The Golden Age of Brass, Vol. II (Summit, 1993)
- The Naples Philharmonic (featuring David Hickman, trumpet) (Summit, 1993)
- The Golden Age of Brass (Summit, 1992)
- Intimate Baroque (Summit, 1992)
- David Hickman, Trumpet (Crystal, 1990)
- Baroque Consort (Crystal, 1979)
- David Hickman, Trumpet (Crystal, 1976)
- David Hickman Goes on Record (Crystal, 1975)
- David Hickman, Trumpet (with the Denver Festival Chamber Orchestra) (Clarino, 1974)
- Concertos for Trumpet (Clarino, 1973)

=== Chamber ===
- Summit Brass Night: Live in Colorado (Summit, 2008)
- Summit Brass Live (Summit, 2003)
- Music of Howard Bradshaw (CBC Records, 1999)
- Spirits of Fire (Summit, 1998)
- Paving the Way (Summit, 1994)
- Ensemble 21 (Summit, 1993)
- Delights (Summit, 1993)
- Saint-Saëns Chamber Music (Summit, 1992)
- American Tribute (Summit, 1992)
- Baroque Brass (Summit, 1992)
- Hindemith: Complete Works for Brass (Summit, 1991)
- Windows (Crystal, 1991)
- The Saint Louis Brass Quintet (Crystal, 1990)
- Colors for Brass (Summit, 1990)
- Tuba 'n Spice (1989)
- Toccata & Fugue (Summit, 1989)
- All American Brass (Pro Arte, 1987)
- Episodes (Pro Arte, 1986)
- Carnival for Brass (Pro Arte, 1985)
