= Alan Baylock =

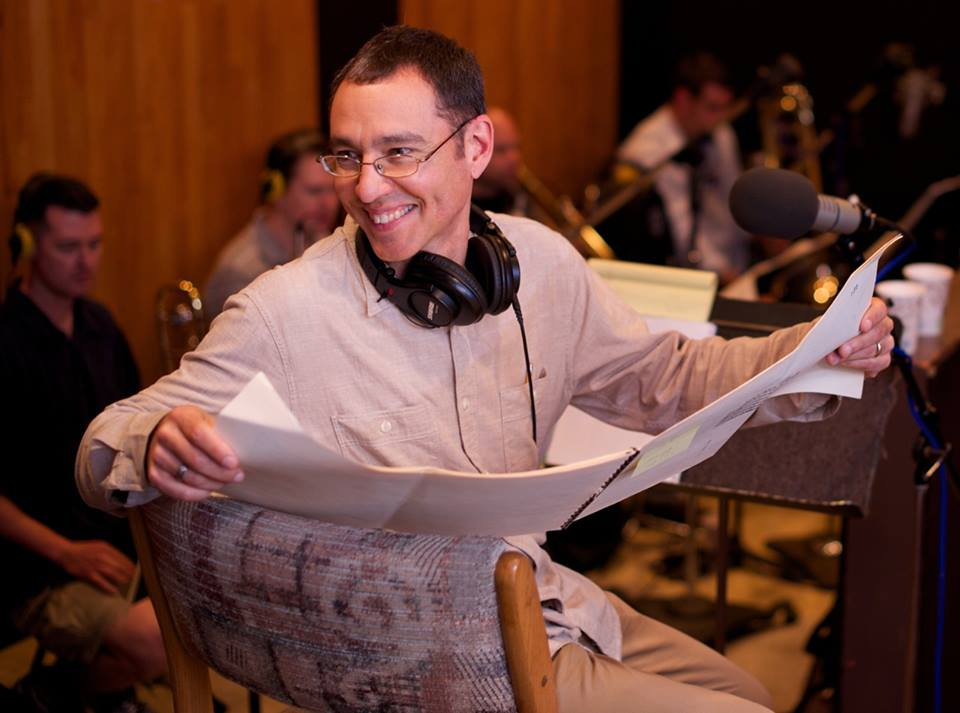

Background information
- Born: September 15, 1967 (age 59); Ebensburg, Pennsylvania
- Genre: Jazz
- Occupations: Composer, Arranger, Educator, Bandleader
- Instrument: Trumpet

Alan Michael Baylock is a composer, arranger, educator, bandleader, clinician, instrumentalist, and the former leader of the Alan Baylock Jazz Orchestra. He was also the Jazz Composer-in-Residence at Shenandoah Conservatory in Winchester, Virginia, from 2011 until 2016 and served as the Chief Arranger for The Airmen of Note jazz ensemble in Washington, D.C., for 20 years before moving to his current position as the Director of the One O'Clock Lab Band at the University of North Texas.

== Biography ==
Alan Baylock graduated from Bishop Carroll High School in Ebensburg, Pennsylvania, in 1985. He received a Bachelor of Music Education in 1990 from Shenandoah Conservatory at Shenandoah University, to which he later returned as an educator and Jazz Composer-in-Residence. He received his Master of Music in Jazz Studies from the University of North Texas in 1994, where his arrangements were featured on numerous recordings by the University of North Texas One O' Clock Lab Band.

In 1996, Baylock enlisted in the United States Air Force, serving as the Chief Arranger for the Airmen of Note—the premier jazz band of the Air Force—for 20 years. He also founded and led the Alan Baylock Jazz Orchestra, a Washington D.C.–based professional jazz ensemble that performed across the U.S. for 15 years, during which time they recorded three studio albums. In 2011, Baylock returned to Shenandoah University to serve as the Jazz Composer-in-Residence, where he also taught jazz arranging and jazz pedagogy and co-directed the conservatory jazz ensemble.

In April 2015, Baylock was announced as the new Director of the One O’Clock Lab Band at the University of North Texas and began full-time in the Fall of 2016.

Baylock still travels extensively as a guest conductor and clinician for groups and conferences across the United States. For ten years, he was a recurring faculty member at the National Jazz Workshop and previously directed the NJW All-Stars Big Band. He is an active member of the Jazz Education Network (JEN) where he mentors recipients of the annual Young Composers Award and serves as a guest clinician for the JENerations jazz festival and is the current Texas State Chapter President.

In 2016, Baylock became an honorary member of Phi Mu Alpha through the Nu Psi chapter at Shenandoah University, and in 2017 he was inducted as an honorary brother into Kappa Kappa Psi by Shenandoah's Kappa Epsilon chapter.

== Music ==
Baylock's music has been performed and/or recorded by jazz greats Freddie Hubbard, Jimmy Heath, Michael Brecker, Maynard Ferguson, Doc Severinsen, Joe Lovano, Paquito D’Rivera, Phil Woods, Arturo Sandoval, Slide Hampton, David Liebman, Rufus Reid, Melissa Aldana, Kurt Rosenwinkel, Kenny Werner, Joshua Redman, Nicholas Payton, Sean Jones, Nnenna Freelon, Tierney Sutton, Kurt Elling and many more. His eclectic talents have also led him to writing music for Roy Clark, Lee Greenwood, Wynonna, Al Jarreau, Chaka Khan, Patti LaBelle, Spyro Gyra, Ronan Tynan, and symphony orchestras in the United States and abroad.

In addition to having his music recorded by others, Baylock has produced three critically acclaimed albums with his own group, the Alan Baylock Jazz Orchestra.

Alan Baylock's music is published by Alfred Music Publications and Projazzcharts.com.

== Published works ==
=== Compositions ===
- A Lift of the Foot (ProJazzCharts.com)
- Blues for Stew's Shoes (ProJazzCharts.com)
- Chiaroscuro (ProJazzCharts.com)
- El Abrazo (Alfred Music)
- Em Uma Semana (ProJazzCharts.com)
- Hickory & Twine (Alfred Music)
- Hullabaloo (Alfred Music)
- Intensities In Ten Cities (ProJazzCharts.com)
- Late w/ Kate (ProJazzCharts.com)
- Livin' Larger Than Life (Alfred Music)
- The Phrygian Five (ProJazzCharts.com)
- Quotient (ProJazzCharts.com)
- Sea Changes (Alfred Music)
- Spin Cycle (Alfred Music)
- Stole Back My Soul (ProJazzCharts.com)
- Syncopation: Universal Groove (ProJazzCharts.com)
- Torque (ProJazzCharts.com)
- Two Seconds to Midnight (Alfred Music)
- Unparliamentary Language (ProJazzCharts.com)
- Without A Doubt (ProJazzCharts.com)

=== Arrangements ===
- A Shade of Jade (Alfred Music)
- Along Came Betty (Alfred Music)
- Barebones (ProJazzCharts.com)
- The Beat Goes On (Alfred Music)
- Big Swing Face (Alfred Music)
- Bridge Over Troubled Waters (Alfred Music)
- Buds (Alfred Music)
- Caravan (Alfred Music)
- Chameleon (Alfred Music)
- Cherokee (Sheet Music Plus)
- Cold Duck Time (Alfred Music)
- The Gates of Madrid (ProJazzCharts.com)
- Give It One (Alfred Music)
- Go Tell It On the Mountain (Alfred Music)
- Goodbye Pork Pie Hat (Alfred Music)
- Have Yourself a Merry Little Christmas (Alfred Music)
- Isfahan (Alfred Music)
- It's All Right With Me (Alfred Music)
- I've Grown Accustomed To Her Face (Sheet Music Plus)
- Jive Samba (Alfred Music)
- Let It Snow! Let It Snow! Let It Snow! (Alfred Music)
- Love For Sale (Alfred Music)
- Midnight Voyage (Alfred Music)
- Moment's Notice (Alfred Music)
- "One Mint Julep" (Alfred Music)
- Our Country's Flag (Alfred Music)
- Over the Rainbow (Alfred Music)
- Road Song (Alfred Music)
- Round Midnight (UNC Jazz Press)
- See the Pyramid (ProJazzCharts.com)
- Shanghigh (Alfred Music)
- Song for Bilbao (Alfred Music)
- Struttin' With Some Barbecue (Alfred Music)
- Take the "A" Train (Alfred Music)
- Tell Me a Bedtime Story (Alfred Music)
- Things Ain't What They Used to Be (Alfred Music)
- Up On the Housetop (ProJazzCharts.com)
- We Three Kings (Alfred Music)
- What a Wonderful World (Alfred Music)
- What is This Thing Called Love? (Alfred Music)
- When I Fall in Love (Alfred Music)
- Winter Wonderland (UNC Jazz Press)

== Discography ==
=== As composer ===
- 1992 – University of North Texas One O' Clock Lab Band – Lab '92 (LA9201-NS)
- 1993 – University of North Texas One O' Clock Lab Band – Live in Portugal (LA9302-NS)
- 1993 – University of North Texas One O' Clock Lab Band – Lab '93 (LA9301-NS)
- 1994 – University of North Texas One O' Clock Lab Band – Lab '94 (LA9401-NS)
- 1995 – University of North Texas One O' Clock Lab Band – Lab '95 (LA9501-NS)
- 1996 – Maynard Ferguson & Big Bop Nouveau – One More Trip to Birdland (Concord CCD-4729)
- 2006 – Maynard Ferguson – MF Horn VI: Live at Ronnie's
- 2006 – Army Jazz Knights – Commissions 2006 (JKJC 07)
- 2007 – University of North Texas One O’ Clock Lab Band – Live at Blues Alley (LI0702-NS)
- 2007 – Howard University Jazz Ensemble – HUJE 2006
- 2008 – Airmen of Note – Airmen of Note Live! (BOL-08)
- 2008 – Lovesome Thing – Adoraba
- 2008 – DiMartino/Osland Jazz Orchestra – Quotient (Seabreeze SBJ-2149)
- 2008 – University of North Texas One O' Clock Lab Band – Live at Blues Alley
- 2012 – Airmen of Note – Compositions (BOL-1202)
- 2016 – Airmen of Note – Baylock/Crotty/Nestico/Cray
- 2020 – Pete Ellman Big Band – For Pete's Ache

=== As arranger ===
- 1994 – University of North Texas One O' Clock Lab Band – One O' Clock Standard Time (LA9402-NS)
- 1998 – Airmen of Note – Christmas Time is Here – (BOL-99)
- 1999 – Airmen of Note – 50th Anniversary (BOL-9907)
- 2000 – Capitol Quartet – Anything Goes (Summit DCD 280)
- 2001 – Cathy Jean – Marshall Road Apocalypse (CJ9900)
- 2002 – University of Miami Concert Jazz Band – Jazzmiami (Summit DCD 292)
- 2002 – San Diego State University Jazz Ensemble – Where's My Hasenpfeffer? (Sea Breeze Vista SBV 4553)
- 2002 – Indianapolis Jazz Orchestra – The Test of Time
- 2003 – Pete BarenBregge-Frank Russo Group – Point of Grace (Summit DCD 358)
- 2004 – David Liebman – Beyond the Line (OmniTone 12204)
- 2004 – Howard University – HUJE 2003
- 2005 – OmniTone Sampler – Odyssey 2005
- 2005 – University of North Texas One O' Clock Lab Band – Lab 2005
- 2006 – Howard University Jazz Ensemble – HUJE 2005
- 2006 – University of Wisconsin-Eau Claire Jazz Ensemble I – Jazz in Clear Water: Lockbox (Seabreeze SBV-4569)
- 2006 – Ronan Tynan – Dawning of the Day (Decca B0007339-02)
- 2007 – Pattie Cossentino – Invitation
- 2010 – Airmen of Note – 60th Anniversary (BOL 1002)
- 2011 – Crossroads Big Band – Christmastime is Here
- 2011 – Crescent Super Band – What It Is (Big Swing Face)
- 2012 – University of Wisconsin-Eau Claire – Funk in Deep Freeze
- 2013 – Jim Widner – And the Beat Goes On (Chase Music Group CMD8080)
- 2013 – Ira B. Liss Big Band Machine – It's About Time
- 2021 – Matt Niess and the Capitol Bones – The Beat Goes On

=== As producer/assistant producer ===
- 2004 – Ben Patterson Sextet – The Prowl (Bonecat 102601)
- 2004 – Airmen of Note – Tiempo Latino (BOL-0401)
- 2005 – Airmen of Note – A Holiday Note From Home (BOL-0502)
- 2005 – Christina Crerar – Little Jazz Bird
- 2006 – Airmen of Note – Out in Front (BOL-0604)

=== As leader ===
- 2003 – Alan Baylock Jazz Orchestra – Two Seconds to Midnight (Seabreeze SB-2127)
- 2008 – Alan Baylock Jazz Orchestra – Eastern Standard Time
- 2014 – Alan Baylock Jazz Orchestra – Prime Time (With Special Guest Doc Severinsen)
- 2017 – University of North Texas One O' Clock Lab Band – Lab 2017
- 2018 – University of North Texas One O' Clock Lab Band – Lab 2018
- 2019 – University of North Texas One O' Clock Lab Band – Lab 2019
- 2020 – University of North Texas One O' Clock Lab Band – Lab 2020

=== As author of liner notes ===
- 2008 – University of North Texas – Lab 2008 (LA0801-NS)
- 2012 – University of Wisconsin-Eau Claire – Funk in Deep Freeze
