= Ralph Sauer =

American trombonist

Ralph C. Sauer is an American trombonist, arranger and teacher. He was principal trombonist of the Los Angeles Philharmonic for 32 years.

Sauer was born in Philadelphia, Pennsylvania, and graduated from the Eastman School of Music where he studied with Emory Remington.

He was the principal trombonist of the Toronto Symphony Orchestra from 1968 to 1974. During that time, he was also the principal trombonist with the Canadian Opera Company and the Canadian Broadcasting Corporation, and taught at the University of Toronto.

In 1974, Sauer was named principal trombonist of the Los Angeles Philharmonic by Zubin Mehta. He made his Los Angeles Philharmonic concerto debut in 1979, performing Kazimierz Serocki's Concerto for Trombone and Orchestra with Zubin Mehta conducting - a work whose U.S. premiere Sauer gave at the Eastman School of Music in 1965. In March 2003, Sauer premiered Augusta Read Thomas's Trombone Concerto with the Los Angeles Philharmonic, conducted by Esa-Pekka Salonen. He was also a frequent performer with the philharmonic's New Music Group. He retired from the orchestra in 2006.

Sauer has appeared as soloist with many orchestras and has given master classes and recitals throughout Europe, Scandinavia, Japan, Mexico, Costa Rica, Canada, and the United States. He has appeared at the Stratford, Marlboro, and Aspen summer music festivals and was visiting professor at the Eastman School of Music and Arizona State University as well as an instructor with the New World Symphony (Miami) and the International Brass Festival in Melbourne (Australia). He has also taught at the Norwegian Academy (Oslo) and the Sibelius Academy (Helsinki). Sauer is currently on the faculty of the Music Academy of the West. He has taught many prominent trombonists, including Christian Lindberg.

From his earliest days as a student at the Eastman School of Music in the mid 1960s up to the present (2013), Sauer has transcribed and arranged hundreds of works by many composers, scoring them for various sized brass ensembles, trombone ensembles, tuba ensembles, trombone solos, tuba, euphonium, trumpet and horn solos. His works are currently distributed by Cherry Classics Music (www.CherryClassics.com).

Sauer is a founding member of Summit Brass, and is a clinician for Shires trombones.

In 2023, the Dietrich Emory Sauer Memorial Scholarship was endowed in perpetuity to the Music Academy of the West in Santa Barbara, California. The 2023 winner was Luke Sieve, now bass trombonist with the Cleveland Orchestra. In 2024, the winner was Andrew Zaharis, now 2nd/assistant first with the Kennedy Center Orchestra. In 2025, the winner was Jonathan Laing, now principal with the Richmond Symphony.

== Selected recordings ==
He is featured on a number of recordings, including:

- A recording of works by Telemann, Handel, Haydn, and others (with Zita Carno on keyboards) (Crystal Records)
- The Mahler Symphony No. 3, with Esa-Pekka Salonen conducting the Los Angeles Philharmonic (with Anna Larsson, contralto; Donald Green, posthorn; Martin Chalifour, violin; Paulist Boy Choristers of California, Women of the Los Angeles Master Chorale) (Sony Classical)
- Two discs of orchestral excerpts for trombone with commentary (Summit Records, OrchestraPro series). These are among the most sought after discs for those preparing for orchestral trombone auditions
