= Dorothy Hindman =

American composer and music educator (born 1966)

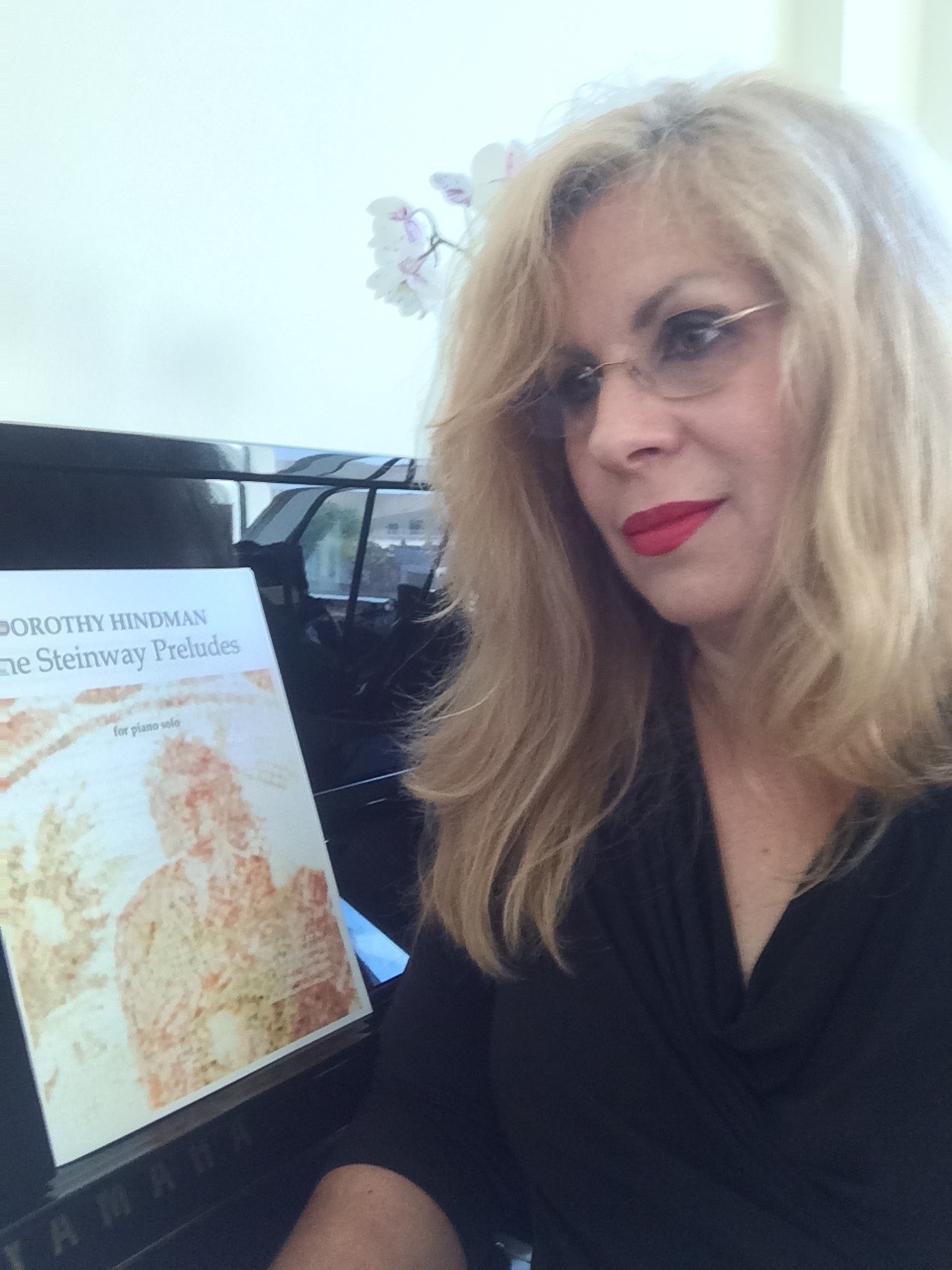
Dorothy Hindman, March 2016

Dorothy Hindman (born March 13, 1966) is an American composer and music educator.

== Early life and studies ==
Born in Miami, Florida on March 13, 1966, Hindman had intense early exposure to classical music from her mother, Dorothy Hindman Lyon, a gifted classical pianist and scientist, and her father, William Murphy Hindman, an actor and manager at that time of WTMI, Miami's classical radio station. Formal music study began late for her, at age 16, when she entered Miami-Dade College as a piano major with the intention to study synthesis. This path led her to avant-garde electronic music and at 19 she began a composition major at the University of Miami, studying with composer Dennis Kam, and graduating magna cum laude with a Bachelor of Music in 1988. Her studies continued at Duke University with Stephen Jaffe and Thomas Oboe Lee, receiving her Master of Arts in the composition in 1989. In 1990, she became a University Fellow at the University of Miami, resuming her studies with Dennis Kam, with whom she shared deep interests in philosophy, musical meaning, individual perception, originality, and profundity. In November–December 1994, she completed additional studies at the Atlantic Center for the Arts with composer Louis Andriessen, reflected in her interests in the formal structures of Bach and Stravinsky as well as her adaptations of social and popular influences in her music.

== Career ==
Hindman has been commissioned by and worked with prominent American and international ensembles including the Empire City Men's Chorus (NYC), the Caraval Quartet (NYC), the Goliard Ensemble (NYC), Bent Frequency Duo (Atlanta), Pulse Ensemble (Miami), Atlas Saxophone Quartet (Chicago), the Gregg Smith Singers (NYC), the New York Saxophone Quartet (NYC), Duo46, Thamyris (Atlanta), and the Corona Guitar Kvartet (Denmark). She has written solos for virtuosic performers including bassist Robert Black (Bang on a Can), cellist Craig Hultgren, guitarist Paul Bowman, and percussionists Stuart Gerber and Scott Deal. Her works have been performed and read by professional orchestras including the Women's Philharmonic Orchestra (San Francisco), the Alabama Symphony Orchestra, the Kyiv Philharmonic, the Brevard Symphony Orchestra, and the North Florida Symphony Orchestra, and by prominent youth orchestras Greater Miami Youth Symphony, South Florida Youth Symphony, and the Etowah Youth Orchestra. Collaborations with visual artists include music for the Italian Dreams video artist/photographer Carrie Mae Weems, and the installation The Wall Calls to Me in collaboration with artist Sally Wood Johnson, exhibited in major museums throughout the Southeast, including the Huntsville Museum of Art, Montgomery Museum of Fine Arts, Mobile Museum of Art, and other galleries.

Her music has been performed at major venues across the world, including Weill Recital Hall at Carnegie Hall; the United Nations; and the Adrienne Arsht Center (Miami); internationally in France; Germany; Italy; Copenhagen, Denmark; Catania, Sicily; Havana, Guantanamo, and Las Tunas, Cuba; Canberra, Australia; Estonia; London, England; and Montreal, Canada; and throughout the United States, including: NYC, Brooklyn, and Harlem, New York; Miami, Wynwood Arts District, Gainesville, Tallahassee, and Brevard, Florida; Connecticut; Pittsburgh, Pennsylvania; St. Paul, Bloomington, and Ham Lake, Minnesota; Camden, New Jersey; Atlanta, Georgia; Flagstaff, Arizona; Birmingham, Auburn, Tuscaloosa, and Gadsden, Alabama; Chattanooga; Durham, Winston-Salem, Charlotte, and Greensboro, North Carolina; and.

Festival and conference performances of Hindman's music include the 2015 Australian Flute Festival, the 2015 Havana Contemporary Music Festival, the 2015 Birmingham New Music Festival, 2015 New Music Greensboro, Society of Composers National and Region IV Conferences, the Southeastern Composers' League Annual Forum, the Imagine Festival, the SEAMUS'96 National Conference, the MAY IN MIAMI Young Composers Workshop, the JUNE IN BUFFALO Festival, and the Czech-American Summer Music Institute program in Prague.

Hindman's awards, fellowships, grants and recognition include a 2015 Artist Access Grant from the Miami-Dade County Department of Cultural Affairs, 2015 Winner of Audience Favorite and Second Prize, Analog Arts' Iron Composer, a 2015 University of Miami Provost Research Award, 2013 Award of Excellence, and Award of Merit, Global Music Awards for Creativity/Originality for Tapping the Furnace, the Almquist Choral Composition Award, a Nancy Van de Vate International Composition Prize for Opera, Winner of the International Society of Bassists Solo Composition Competition, an Alabama State Council on the Arts Individual Artist Fellowship, and Winner of the NACUSA Young Composers Competition.

Residencies and guest composer appearances include the 2016 Summer Composition Intensive in South Bend, Indiana, 2016 Miami International Piano Festival Academy, 2015 AmiCa Credenze POP Festival in Sicily, 2009 Seaside Escape to Create Fellowship Residency, 2005 Visiting Artist at the American Academy in Rome, 2005 resident composer at the Visby International Centre for Composers, Sweden, 2009 Composer-in-Residence for the Goliard Ensemble, and Resident at Hambidge Center for the Arts. She has given masterclasses at the New World School, the University of Florida, Florida International University, Florida State University, University of Fairbanks, Alaska, Baldwin Wallace University, Jacksonville State University, Arkansas State University, the University of Missouri-Columbia, Middle Tennessee State University, and the University of Tennessee-Chattanooga's Contemporary Music Symposium.

In addition to her compositional activities, she promoted new music by: presenting concerts for ten years as a co-founder of the Birmingham Art Music Alliance in 1994; hosted the Po-Mo Show from 2012 to 2014 on wvum.org, a weekly radio show devoted to a post-modern mix of classical music written since 1980; and was a classical and new music critic for the South Florida Classical Review and the Miami Herald from 2011 to 2015. She was Assistant Editor of the LIVING MUSIC journal, and has been published in 20TH CENTURY MUSIC, the College Music Symposium, and The Society of Composers Newsletter. She authored the article on "Composition, profession" appearing in the Encyclopedia of Women in Music, Kristine Burns, ed, Oryx Press.

A native of Miami, Florida, Hindman returned in 2010 and is currently Associate Professor of Composition at the Frost School of Music, University of Miami, after holding a tenured professorship at Birmingham-Southern College. Her music is published by Subito Music Distribution, dorn/Needham Publications, and NoteNova. Hindman is married to composer Charles Norman Mason.

== Music ==
=== Organization ===
Hindman's music is unique and multilayered, revealing deep organization on every level. Elements of her personal style include economy of materials; works such as "drowningXnumbers" for amplified cello (1994 for Craig Hultgren) show intense extension and development of a single idea to create complex organic structures. She favors symmetrical harmonies and consonance, and uses timbre as a structural element. Recent works employ spectral techniques. Form arises from the material, with juxtaposition, fragmentation, and combination serving to prolong moods throughout a work. Driving, motoric rhythms contribute immediate surface impact to the music.

=== Politics and social commentary ===
Hindman's work usually deals with political themes and the history of places, and how that history is distorted through the lens of contemporary individual perception. Some works, such as Monumenti for violin and cello and centro for violin and piano, both written at the American Academy in Rome in 2005, explore the relationship of the modern individual to the physical and artistic remains of past civilizations. More recent works such as Tapping the Furnace for speaking percussionist (2006) and Nine Churches for guitar quartet and chamber orchestra (2006-7) focus on the cultural, social and economic legacies of industrialization, slavery, and racist policies in the New South.

Hindman's most recent works, R.I.P.T. (2014) for speaking saxophonist and percussionist and Rough Ride (2016) for speaking cello, are part of her Trademarking Trayvon cycle for chamber orchestra Bent Frequency of Atlanta, exploring and musically integrating ideas and emblems of African American expressions of grief and outrage in the wake of the epidemic of gun violence and murder of black men and women, specifically focusing on the ways in which protest became product around the most sensationalized cases.

=== Autobiographical works ===
Her work is often autobiographical, responding in structural ways to events as they unfold and affect her work. Metric schemes correspond to meaningful numeric patterns such as telephone numbers; harmonic structures may be based upon names, dates, places; emotional levels are subtle, complex, and varied within a single work. Needlepoint, Magic City, Seconds, Time Management, Taut, Setting Century, Cascade)

=== Phenomenological influences ===
Her work is usually perceptually based in the individual (Drift, Jerusalem Windows, Monumenti), informed by her own phenomenological investigations of how music functions, based on the writings of Edmund Husserl and Martin Heidegger. There is often, as with history, a presentation of incomplete ideas, which are intended to be completed in the mind of the listener. It is a language of connotations; within each piece, a new syntax is fully established to allow the perceptive, active listener to respond to or to complete fragmentary statements, which the composer, in turn, comments upon, verifies or denies later in the work. There is a deliberate engagement of the listener, a demand upon one's attention which is rewarded through correspondence.

== Works ==
=== Orchestral ===
- Beijing for youth orchestra, 1989
- Magic City for orchestra, 1999
- With Sighs too Deep for Words ..., Concerto for Cello and Orchestra, 2000
- Setting Century for orchestra, 2003
- Strata for orchestra, 2004
- Urban Myths for youth orchestra in three movements: The Babysitter, Roswell, and The Hook, 2009

=== Large chamber ensemble ===
- Fury's Chalice for wind octet, 1992
- Chemistry for chamber orchestra, 1993
- Nine Churches for guitar quartet and chamber orchestra, 2006–07
- Cascade for saxophone ensemble, 2012
- Mechanisms for flute ensemble, 2012
- Fission for wind band, 2013

=== Small chamber ensemble ===
- From Censer Smoke ... for soprano, flute, violin, guitar and marimba, 1994
- Setting Century for flute, clarinet, violin, cello and piano, 1999
- Jerusalem Windows for Violin, Cello and Piano, 2002
- Drift for saxophone quartet 2003
- Taut for guitar quartet, 2003
- Lost in Translation for soprano saxophone and piano, 2005
- Monumenti for Violin and Cello, 2005
- centro for Violin and Piano, 2005
- three small gestures for Violin and Guitar, 2006 (for Duo46)
- The Pillow Book, song cycle for mezzo-soprano, saxophone, violin, cello and piano, 2009
- The Road to Damascus for string quartet, 2010
- Big Fun for baritone saxophone and piano, 2012
- Heroic Measures for clarinet, violin and piano, 2014
- R.I.P.T for saxophone and percussion, 2014
- Entwined for B-flat clarinet and alto saxophone, 2015

=== Instrumental solo ===
- Soliloquy for Clarinet, 1991
- Forward Looking Back, Piano Suite, 1991–92
- Beyond the Cloud of Unknowing for marimba, 1992
- "drowningXnumbers" for amplified cello, 1994–95
- Echo for French horn, 1996
- Trembling for flute, 1998
- Time Management for double bass, 2004
- Needlepoint for classical guitar, 2004
- The Steinway Preludes for piano, 2004
- Swell for organ, 2005
- Tapping the Furnace for speaking percussionist, 2006
- Echoi for French horn, 2011
- I Feel Fine for classical guitar, 2013
- Rough Ride for speaking cellist, 2016

=== Choral ===
- I Have Heard ... for SATB choir, 1993, 1996
- Echo for Horn, 1996
- Resurrection an Easter choral anthem 1998
- Incarnation, a Christmas choral anthem, 1998
- Of the Father's Love Begotten anthem for SATB choir and organ, 2000
- Psalm 121 for a capella SATB choir, 2000
- Sursum Corda for a capella SATB choir, 2008
- Prothalamia for men's chorus and organ, 2010
- You Shall Not Go Down for a cappella men's chorus, 2010

=== Vocal ===
- Three Songs of Reminiscence for tenor and piano, 1997
- Is this then a touch? for baritone and piano, 2006

=== Opera ===
- Pandora's Box, youth opera for children's choir and piano, 1999
- Louise: the Story of a Magdalen, opera, 2002

=== Fixed media with or without instruments ===
- fin de cycle for piano and tape, 1996
- Tonal Music for mobile phones in 2004
- Italian Dreams, soundfile for video of the same name by Carrie Mae Weems, 2006
- Bathtime for soundfile (stereo), 2007
- Seconds for soundfile (5.0 surround, stereo versions), 2005.
- Multiverses for marimba solo with Max/MSP or marimba quartet, 2009
- Fantasia for Karen Alone for violin and soundfile, 2010
- The Wall Calls to Me for soundfile (mp3) and 8 channels, for visual art installation by Sally Wood Johnson, 2010
- Sound/Water for cello and soundfile, 2011
- 1000 Swimmers in the Canals for 2 electric guitars, keyboard, and live processing, 2013

== Discography ==
- Tapping the Furnace: innova Recordings 848, © 2013 including: Drift for saxophone quartet; "drowningXnumbers" for amplified cello; fin de cycle for piano and digital media; Tapping the Furnace for speaking percussion solo; Needlepoint for guitar solo; Magic City for orchestra.
- 60X60 (2006-2007): Vox Novus VN 002, © 2008, featuring bathtime for soundfile
- Musings: Society of Composers, Inc. Series, no. 22: Capstone Records CPS-8787, 2007, featuring Needlepoint, recorded by Paul Bowman, guitar
- A Slice of the Scene: 60X60 2005: Vox Novus VN 001, © 2007, featuring Seconds for soundfile
- Masterworks of the New Era: ERMMedia, Vol. 7, © 2005, featuring Magic City, recorded by the Kiev Philharmonic, Robert Ian Winstin conducting
- Semantemes: Living Artist Recordings, Vol. 10, © 2002, featuring Trembling, recorded by Donald Ashworth, Jr
- From Shook Foil: Living Artist Recordings, Vol. 6, © 2000, featuring I Have Heard…, recorded by the Gregg Smith Singers
- Winds and Voices: Living Artist Recordings, Vol. 5, © 2000, featuring Three Songs of Reminiscence
- Places Not Remote: Music from the Setting Century, Living Artist Recordings, Vol. 3, © 1998, featuring fin de cycle
- In Yet Longer Light's Delay: Music from the Setting Century, Living Music Recordings, Vol. I, © 1996, featuring "drowningXnumbers"
- University of Miami/Society of Composers, Inc: NEW MUSIC/YOUNG COMPOSERS, © 1994, featuring Beyond the Cloud of Unknowing
