= The Airmen of Note =

Music performers of the United States Air Force

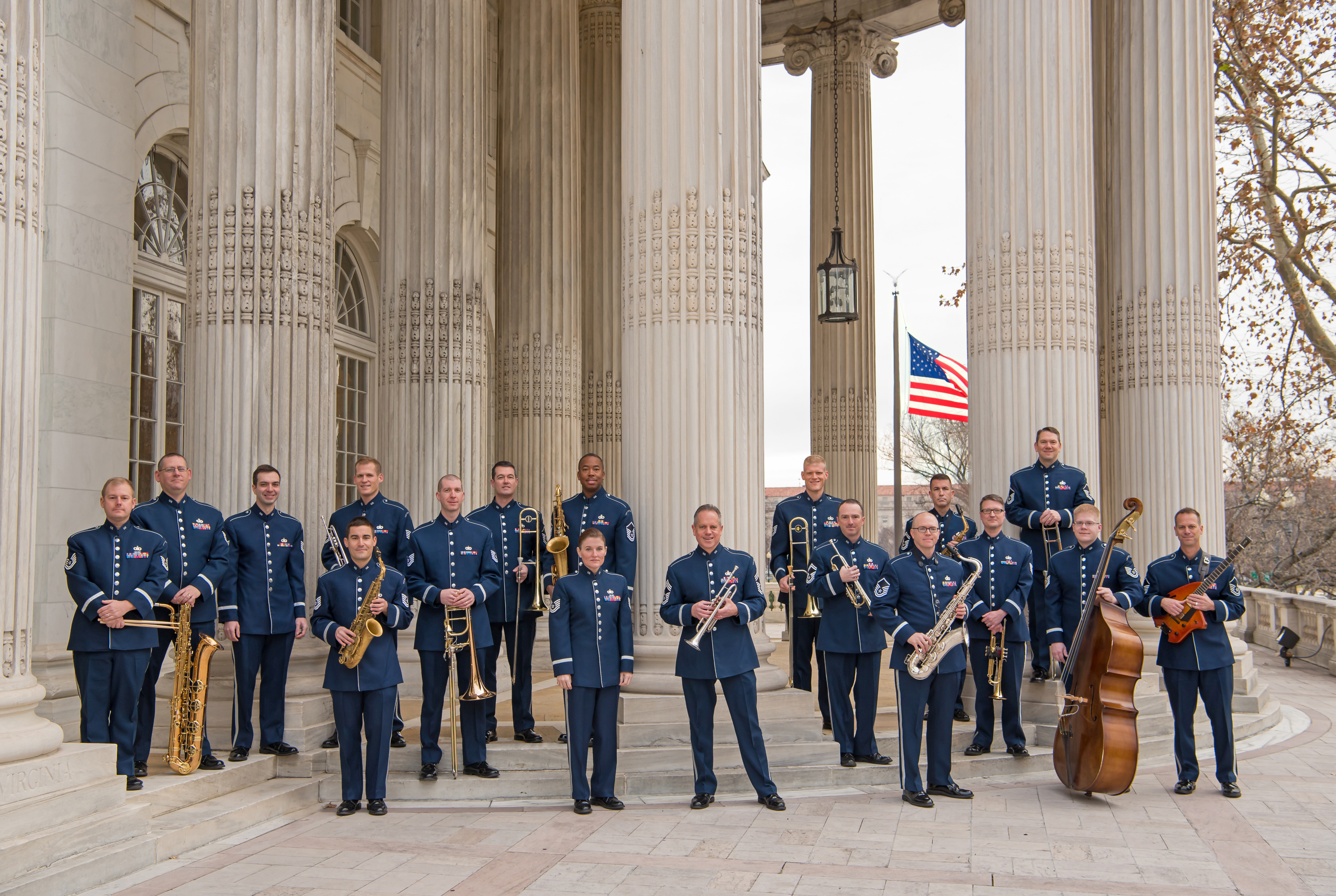
The Airmen of Note, 2018, DAR Hall, Washington D.C.

The Airmen of Note is a jazz ensemble that forms part of the United States Air Force Band. Created in 1950 to carry on the tradition of the Major Glenn Miller Army Air Forces Orchestra, the "Note" is a touring big band that consists of 18 professional jazz musicians.

The band has presented jazz performances to audiences throughout the United States, Europe, and Asia and produces broadcasts and recordings, with one release, Cool Yule, reaching number two on the JazzWeek jazz album chart.

In 1954, the Airmen of Note played Miller's band in the movie The Glenn Miller Story.

== Musical style ==
The Glenn Miller sound has remained central, but the band adopted a more contemporary sound in the 1950s and 1960s largely due to staff arrangers such as Sammy Nestico. Over the past four decades, Mike Crotty and Alan Baylock have taken that role. To augment its writing staff, the Airmen of Note has commissioned works by Bob Florence, Bob Mintzer, Rob McConnell, and Bill Holman. Sammy Nestico and former band member Tommy Newsom have composed works for the group. The group took a further step in diversifying their sound in their 2019 album Global Reach, which featured tunes inspired by cultures from across the world.

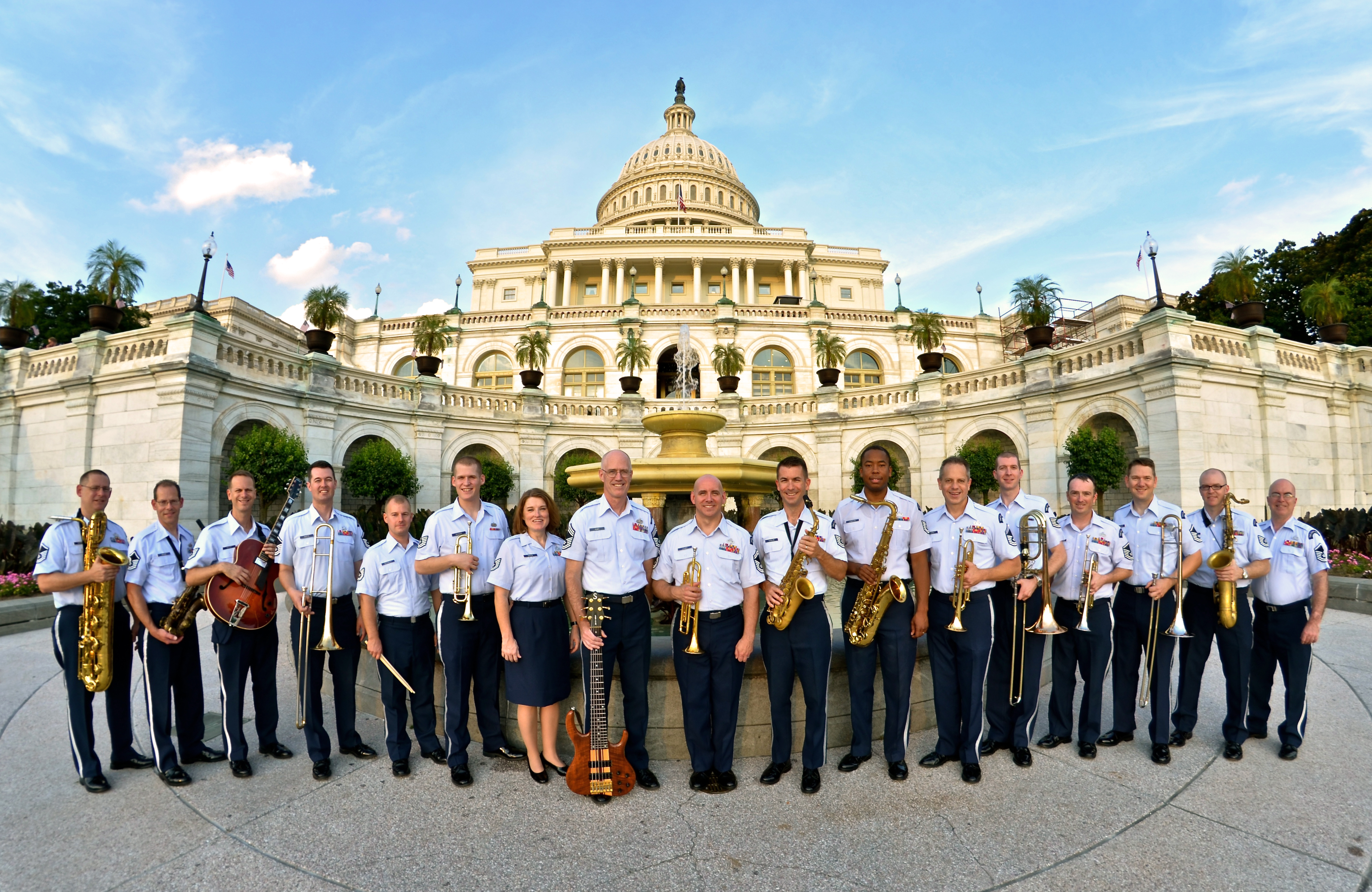
The Airmen of Note, 2013, U.S. Capitol, Washington D.C.

== Music education ==
Many of its members have backgrounds in music education. They lead clinics at high schools and colleges across the country and have been invited to perform at conventions such as the International Association of Jazz Educators, Music Educators National Conference, and The Midwest Clinic.

== Guests ==
The Airmen of Note have recorded and performed with Allen Vizzutti, Dizzy Gillespie, Joe Williams, Sarah Vaughan and Nancy Wilson. In 1990, the Airmen of Note established the Jazz Heritage Series, featuring the "Note" in concert with icons of jazz. Musicians that have joined the "Note" for the program include Al Jarreau, Clark Terry, Phil Woods, Kurt Elling, Kurt Rosenwinkel, Paquito D'Rivera, Nicholas Payton, Gordon Goodwin, and Karrin Allyson. Every year, the Jazz Heritage Series is broadcast over National Public Radio, independent jazz radio stations, satellite radio, and the internet.

== Discography ==
- Surprising Sounds of the Airmen of Note (1966)
- Big Band Sound '67 (1967)
- In Concert Sound (1967)
- Airmen of Note & Friends (1968)
- Here Come the Airmen of Note (1968)
- Rock Jazz (1970)
- With a Little Help From Our Friends (1972)
- Two Sides of the Airmen of Note (1973)
- Come Out Swingin (1973)
- Airmen of Note and Sarah Vaughan (1974)
- Brothers in Blue (1974)
- New Spirit (1977)
- Today! (1978)
- Just in Time (1978)
- Live from Mobile (1979)
- Just the Way We Are (1980)
- Noel (1981)
- Better Than Ever (1983)
- Bone Voyage (1984)
- Crystal Gardens (1985)
- Somewhere Out There (1986)
- Jazz Heritage: Old, New, Borrowed & Blue (1989)
- Santa Claus Is Comin' to Town (1991)
- Children of the Night (1993)
- The Glenn Miller Tradition (1994/1982)
- Blues & Beyond (1996)
- Legacy (1997)
- Christmas Time Is Here (1998)
- Invitation (1999)
- Let's Dance (2000)
- Fifty Years of the Airmen of Note (2000)
- ¡Tiempo Latino! (A Celebration of Latin Jazz) (2004)
- A Holiday Note from Home (2006)
- Keep 'em Flying (2006)
- Out in Front (2006)
- Airmen of Note Live! (2007)
- Cool Yule (2009)
- Airmen of Note "60" (2010)
- Compositions (2012)
- Airmen of Note (2016)
- Veterans of Jazz (2017)
- Best of the Jazz Heritage Series, Vol. 1 (2018)
- Global Reach (2019)
- AIR Power! (2019)
- Out Of The Clouds (2023)
- Little Dreamer, Big Dreams (2026)

== See also ==
- United States military bands
- Tim Eyermann – saxophonist
- Walt Levinsky – big band and orchestra musician
- Joe Locke – jazz vibraphonist
- Vaughn Nark – brass instrument musician
- Bob Snyder – brass and woodwind musician
