= The Dixieland Ramblers =

The Dixieland Ramblers are a Dixieland revival jazz ensemble founded by clarinetist Mike Bennett and drummer Tom Stevenson in 1957. The band has recorded at least five albums for Summit Records and Louisiana Red Hot Records.

== Discography ==
- "Dixieland Snowman" (Louisiana Red Hot Records)
- "Live and Lighting It Up in New Orleans" (Summit Records)
- "Bourbon Street to Broadway" (Summit Records)
- "On Campus" (Summit Records)
- "At the Pittsford Inn"
