= Tim Eyermann =

American saxophonist (1947–2007)

Tim Eyermann (1947–May 1, 2007) was a saxophonist, known for his work with The Airmen of Note and as a recording musician.

== Early years ==
He started his musical career at the age of six by taking up piano lessons for two years, he hated them. Tim grew up in Pittsburgh. At 10 he started to play the saxophone. He was also an outstanding high school baseball player and formed a singing group, the El Reys, which made a recording and was popular with Pittsburgh teens.

Then when he was 14, when he was listening to Cannonball Adderley With Strings. He was so inspired, he picked up the alto saxophone and within two years many people say that he was playing professionally.

== Career ==
After graduating from Duquesne University, Eyermann spent six years in the United States Air Force, playing with the NORAD Band and eventually the U.S. Air Force's Airmen of Note. After his discharge from the Air Force, Eyermann became a very busy man recording music as a studio musician. He worked with Count Basie, Maynard Ferguson, Julie Andrews, The Spinners and Anita Baker. In 1974, he formed a band called the East Coast Offering. During that period he also was a studio musician at "Sounds Reasonable" in Washington, D.C., and recorded many tracks on just about every single and double reed instrument for the Folger Shakespeare Theatre, music by then resident composer William Penn. This hard-driving yet funky band was accessible with plenty of solo space for his reeds. Many categorize his music as jazz, hard bop, or fusion. Tim was also nominated for two Grammies. In 1999 Tim released his most recent album Karla's Fire. Tim used Summit Records for many years.

Around 2000–2002 Eyermann moved to Miami, Florida. Tim had dreamed of living down there since he was little kid. In Miami he picked teaching as a private music teacher associated with Gulliver Band Director: Bobby Keating. He also worked playing gigs. Tim was a great man who always had a smile on his face. He died on May 1, 2007, due to complications in surgery, pneumonia spread throughout his body while trying to remove a malignant cancer in his lung. He leaves behind his daughter Angela Marie Eyermann Rivers, his ex-wife Marie Cann, and his loving family in PA.

== Awards in memory of Eyermann ==
- Gulliver Preparatory School: Tim Eyermann Virtuoso Award
- Gulliver Academy: Tim Eyermann Memorial Jazz Improvisation Award

== See also ==
- Gregg Karukas
