= Duo46 =

Violin and Guitar
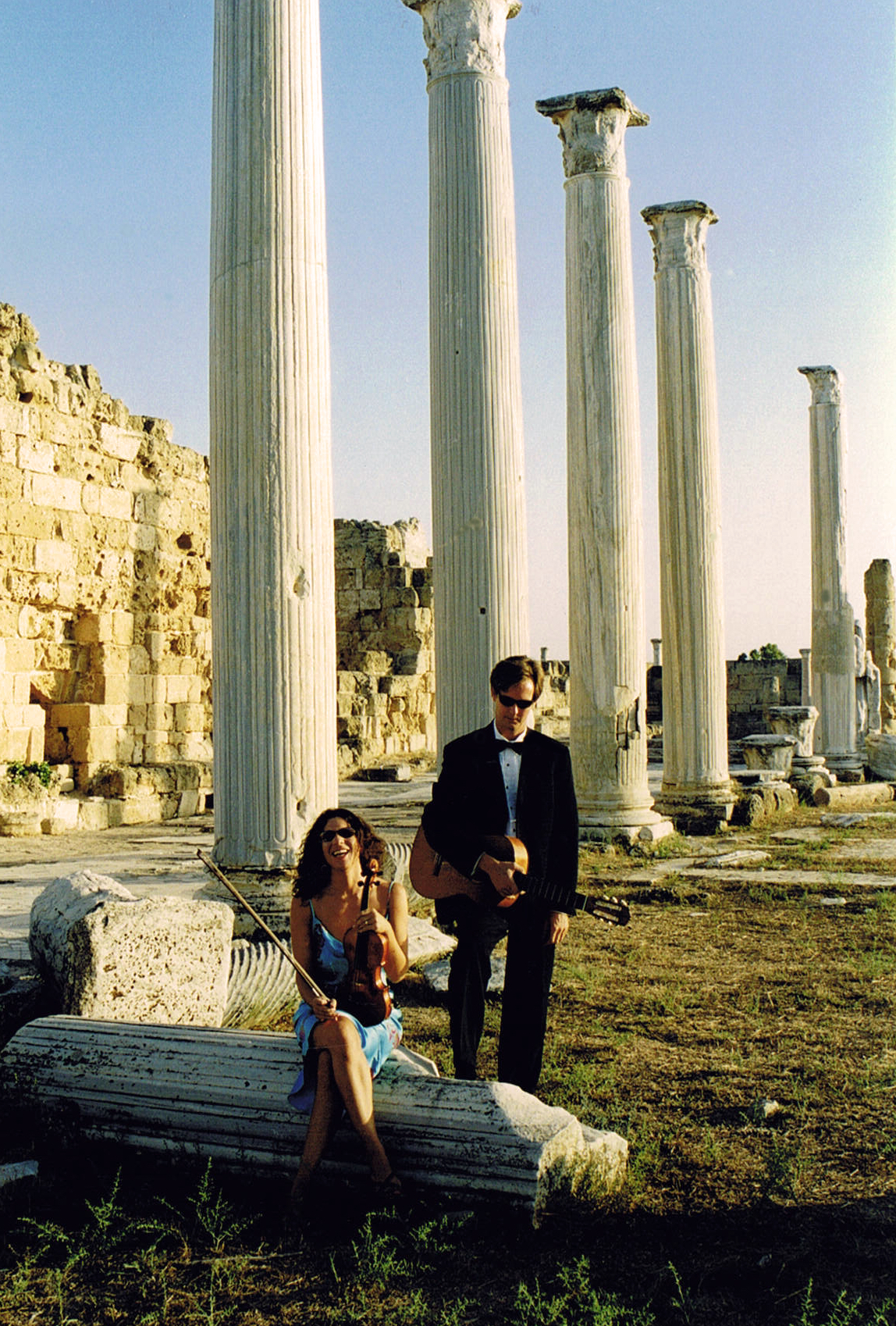
- Duo46

Background information
- Origin: Arizona, United States
- Genre: Contemporary classical
- Occupation: Chamber Ensemble
- Years active: 1994-present
- Labels: Albany Records, Summit Records, Centaur Records, Guitar Plus Records, Parma Recordings, NEOS Records, Meyer Media, Beauport Classical, Parma, Innova
- Members: Beth Ilana Schneider-Gould, violin Dr. Matthew Gould, guitar
- Website: www.duo46.com

The American-Canadian ensemble Duo46 was established in 1994 at the University of Arizona in Tucson, Arizona by guitarist Dr. Matthew Gould and violinist Beth Ilana Schneider-Gould.

Their name comes from a violin having four strings, and a guitar having six strings. It may also have to do with the human body having 46 chromosomes.

Since their founding, they have become leading advocates of new chamber music with guitar. They have commissioned and premiered over 100 works (duets/trios/double concertos) and toured on four continents. Besides concerts as a violin and guitar duo or violin, guitar and third instrument or electronics trio, they conduct masterclasses, reading sessions for student composers, coach chamber ensembles, serve as adjudicators and clinicians and give presentations on a variety of subjects. Duo46 resides in Sudbury, Ontario, Canada. There Matt serves as the director of guitar studies at Cambrian College and is a member of the Sudbury Guitar Trio and artistic director the Sudbury Guitar Society. Beth is concertmaster of the Sudbury Symphony Orchestra and teaches at the Sudbury Symphony Conservatory. Both Matt and Beth are former faculty of Eastern Mediterranean University in the Turkish Republic of Northern Cyprus, Paradise Valley Community College and Matt worked at Arizona State University.

== Recordings ==
- Music from the Ethereal Side of Paradise: Music of John Carollo. Navona Records, NV6148, 2018. (Duo46 performs "Romantica Pasione Suite") Reviews: Art Music Lounge
- Tightly Wound: Music for Strings, Dorothy Hindman. Innova Recordings, #965, 2017. (Duo46 performs "three small gestures")
- High Wire Acts: Chamber Music by Laura Schwendinger. Centaur Records, CRC 3098, 2013. (Collaborative CD including Duo46) Reviews: Fanfare Magazine Issue 37:1 with feature articles by Robert Schulslaper, Barnaby Rayfield, Art Lange, and Colin Clarke (September/October 2013)
- Winter & Construction; Music by Scott Brickman. Rovello Records, 2012
- Vientos: The Music of Hayg Boyadjian. Albany Records, TROY 1219, 2010 (Duo46 and Avi Avital, Mandolin)
- The Guitar Music of Karl Korte. Centaur Records, CRC 3059, 2010. (Duo46 and Erich Oskar Huetter, Cello)
- Pseudosynthesis: The Music of Brian Hulse. Albany Records, TROY1094, 2009. Duo46 with Piano. Reviews: Fanfare (July 2009)
- Artists Around The World Perform Stephen Funk Pearson. KYRA Music, 2009. “Seapeace” for B.A.M. (Duo46 and Avi Avital, Mandolin).
- Fleeting Visions, Collaboration II. Beauport Classical, BC1804, 2008. Compilation CD including Duo46 performing music by John Carollo.
- Fables, Forms and Fears: Music of Paul Richards. Meyer-Media, MM 07008, 2007. Duo46 with Piano. Reviews: Soundboard (Summer, 2008), Classical Guitar (April 2008), Guitar Review (Spring 2008), American Record Guide (April 2008).
- Aires de Sefarad by Jorge Liderman. Albany Records, TROY-829, 2006. 46 Spanish Songs for Violin and Guitar: a commissioned work from UC Berkeley composer Jorge Liderman, partially funded by the Guggenheim Foundation. Reviews: Gramophone (June 2006), American Record Guide (June 2006), Classical Guitar (Sept 2006), Guitar Review (Spring 2008).
- Communing with Music. Summit Records SMT-6921, 2005. Audio Companion CD. The Art of Conscious Listening by Michael Cantello.
- Untaming the Fury. Summit Records SMT-346, 2003. Commissioned American Works for Violin and Guitar. Reviews: Gramophone (April 2003), American Record Guide (June 2003), Strad (June 2003), Classical Guitar (January 2004).
- FM1: Homage to the 50s. Guitar Plus Records GPR-110198, 1998. Original Concert Music, 1950–1959. Reviews: Classical Guitar (April 2001), American Record Guide (Sept/Oct. 1999), Soundboard (Fall/Winter 1999).

== Commissions ==
DUO46 (VIOLIN AND GUITAR)
Daniel Adams Quandary (2000) U.S.
Giovanni Albini Death in Vegas (2006) ITALY
Daniel Asia New Set (2004) U.S.
John Armstrong Five Elements (2020) CANADA Kemal Belevi Turkish Suite (2001) CYPRUS
Allen Brings Sonata Breve (2005) U.S.
Elisabetta Brusa Miniature, Op.5a (2006) ITALY
John Carollo Romanza Pasione Suite (2004) U.S.
Cosimo Colazzo il moto andante, lento (2006) ITALY
Kieth Dippre Year of the Rat (2008) U.S.
William Fetterman Set (2003) U.S.
Neil Flory Venn Music (1998) U.S.
Neil Flory Two Nocturnes (1998) U.S.
Jack Fortner Equal Voices (2008) U.S.
Kenneth D. Froelich Triskaidekaphilia (2006) U.S.
Stacy Garrop Untaming the Fury (1999) U.S.
Geoffrey Gordon Fancyworks (2005) U.S.
Stephen Goss American Pastoral (2009) UK
Giovanni Grosskoff it happened in winter (2002) ITALY
David Hahn W is for Weasel (2003) U.S.
Jeff Harrington L'Ecume des Temps (2002) U.S.
Dorothy Hindman Three Small Gestures (2006) U.S.
Brian Hulse Seastone (2003) U.S.
Pierre Jalbert Sonatine (1999) U.S.
Michael Karmon Sessions (2007) U.S.
Jukka Kervinen next two (2002) FINLAND
Jurg Kindle Quintessence (2000) SWISS
Karl Korte Makams (2003) U.S.
Anthony Joseph Lanman Sonata 46 (1998) U.S. Robert Lemay Gris sur gris(2012) CANADA
Paul Levi Kaleidoscope (2006) U.S.
Jorge Liderman Aires de Sefarad (2004) U.S.
Jorge Liderman Aires de Sefarad II (2007) U.S.
David Lidov Generic Variations (2004) CANADA
David Lipten Time Served (2005) U.S.
Kristy McGarity How the Hell are You Feeling? (1998) U.S.
Mutsuhito Ogino Suite 46 (2005) JAPAN
Terry Winter Owens Elegy (1998) U.S.
Sergio Parotti Sonata, Op. 290 (2003) ARGENTINA
Alla Penkina Recitative, Aria, Dance (2002) RUSSIA
Joshua Penman was the sky as liquid (1998) U.S.
Richard del Pizzo Dopo la tempesta (2002) U.S.
Friedrich Puetz Hausconzert (2002) GERMANY
Michael Quell Enigma (2005) GERMANY
Paul Richards Asphalt Gypsy (1999) U.S.
Paul Richards Prayer of Atonement (2002) U.S.
Paul Richards Collage (2002) U.S.
Jody Rockmaker Frantic Antics (2002) U.S.
Justin Rubin Canzone (2005) U.S.
Russell Sarre Two Pieces (1999) U.S.
Richard Schaefer Structures (2000) U.S.
Laura Schwendinger 2 little whos (2004) U.S.
Jiradej Sethabundhu Smoky Speculations (1998) THAILAND

DUO46 AND COMPUTER
Scott Brickman When I'm 46 (2006) U.S.
Fabrizio Ferrari Synchrony (1999) ITALY
Steve Kornicki Tempo Distortion #2 (2006) U.S.
Karl Korte Virtual Voices (2007) U.S.
Charles Norman Mason Scrapings (2007) U.S.
John Oliver On Freedom (2008) CANADA
Allan Segall Playing With Your Past (2005) U.S.

DUO46 AND CELLO
Karl Korte Evocations (2004) U.S.

DUO46 AND MANDOLIN
Giovanni Albini Nuovo Concerto Italiano (2008) ITALY
Hayg Boyadjin Vientos (2009) ARMENIA
Stephen Funk Pearson Seapeace (2009) U.S.
Justin Rubin Durkh und Durkh (2007) U.S.
Allan Segall Playing With Yesterday's Hit Parade (2009)U.S./HOLLAND

DUO46 AND PIANO Chris Williams A Pattern of Music (2013) AUSTRALIA
Scott Brickman Snowball (2003) U.S.
John Carollo Trio No. 2 (2003) U.S.
Carson Cooman August Latitudes (2002) U.S.
Neil Flory Venn Music II (2007) U.S.
Jeffrey Hoover Ysaye's Dream (2003) U.S.
Ed Mascari Three for Three (2002) U.S. Paul Richards Cypriot Structures (2003) U.S.
Paul Richards Falling on Lobsters in the Dark (2003) U.S.
Michael Quell Blurring Cloud (2010) GERMANY
Justin Rubin Sarabande (2002) U.S.
Richard Schaefer Structures #412 (2003) U.S.

DUO46 AND VIOLA
Kemal Belevi Turkish Trio (2001) CYPRUS
Mustafa Cakal Sunrise in the Meadow (2001) TURKEY
Rafael Hernandez Unlucky Thirteenths (2001) U.S.
Martin Kennedy Distraction (2002) U.S. Georgio Papageorgio Humoresque alla Polacca (2002) CYPRUS
Joseph Pehrson Three Musicians (2002) U.S.

DUO46 AND CLARINET
Daniel Kessner Trio (2010) U.S.

== Festivals ==
Duo46 has made appearances at several music festivals

- 2020 Kiwanis Music Festival Toronto (adjudication guitar)
- 2019 21st Century Guitar Conference, Ottawa, Ontario, Canada (performance J. Oliver On Freedom)
- 2018 Festival of New American Music, Sacramento (performance, music by Asia and Liderman)
- 2018 Guitar Foundation of America, Louisville (performance, adjudication, clinicians)
- 2009-2014 Soundscape New Music Festival, Italy (performance, clinicians)
- 2006-2008 Cortona Contemporary Music Festival, Italy (performance, clinicians)
- 2011 Guitar Foundation of America, Georgia (performance, adjudication, clinicians)
- 2011 Guitar Seminar, Mannes College, NYC (Duo46 performance, panel “Composing for Guitar, concert at the Latin American Center)
- 2009 Guitar Foundation of America, Los Angeles (clinicians)
- 2008 Guitar Foundation of America, San Francisco Conservatory (performance)
- 2006 Guitar Foundation of America, Oberlin Conservatory
- 2006 Entrecuerdas Guitar Festival, Chile (performance, masterclasses, clinicians)
- 2006 Arizona Western Arts Alliance, Los Angeles (Chamber Music America Ensemble Showcase)
- 2005 CSU Fresno New Music Festival (performance, clinicians)
- 2003 Hermopoulis International Guitar Festival, Greece
- 2004 University of Minnesota Deluth New Music Festival (performance, masterclasses, clinicians)
- 2002 Styria Chamber Music Festival, Austria (performance)
- 1999 Great Lakes Chamber Music Festival, Michigan (performance)
- 1998 Music '98, Cincinnati Conservatory of Music, Ohio (performance)

== Radio ==
- British Broadcasting Corporation
- Canadian Broadcasting Corporation
- European Broadcasting Union
- National Public Radio
- Radio New Zealand
- Bayrak Radio and Television (Turkey)
