= Two Seconds to Midnight =

Studio album by Alan Baylock Jazz Orchestra
- Released: 2003
- Genre: Big Band
- Length: 72:59:00
- Label: Sea Breeze Jazz

Alan Baylock Jazz Orchestra chronology
Two Seconds to Midnight (2003)	Eastern Standard Time (2008)

Two Seconds to Midnight is the first album released by the Alan Baylock Jazz Orchestra, a Washington, D.C.–based big band. Released in 2003 through Sea Breeze Jazz Records, the album is composed of arrangements by Baylock on a number of jazz standards as well as some of his original compositions. The album featured guest appearances by pianist Kenny Werner. It was recorded at Bias Recording Studios in Springfield, Virginia.

== Track listing ==
All arrangements are by Alan Baylock unless otherwise noted.

No.	Title	Composer	Length
1.	"Song for Bilbao"	Pat Metheny	6:38
2.	"Night & Day"	Cole Porter	6:09
3.	"Skylark"	Hoagy Carmichael	5:26
4.	"Two Seconds to Midnight"	Alan Baylock	6:26
5.	"Sea Changes (trio)"	Alan Baylock	8:32
6.	"Out House"	Jerry Bergonzi	7:48
7.	"One Mint Julep"	Rudolph Toombs	6:09
8.	"Dee Minor"	Mike Mainieri	7:57
9.	"Cottontail"	Duke Ellington	13:08
10.	"When I Fall In Love"	Victor Young/Ned Heyman	4:45

== Personnel ==
The Alan Baylock Jazz Orchestra is composed of musicians from the D.C. area, particularly from the Airmen of Note, Army Blues, and Navy Commodores jazz ensembles. This album also featured renowned jazz pianist Kenny Werner as a guest artist on tracks "Cottontail" and "Sea Changes".

=== Bandleader/Arranger ===
- Alan Baylock

=== Saxophones ===
- Andy Axelrad – alto sax, flute
- Antonio Orta – alto sax, flute
- Joseph Henson – alto sax
- Tyler Kuebler – tenor sax, clarinet
- Luis Hernandez – tenor sax
- Jeff Antoniuk – tenor sax, soprano sax, clarinet
- Chad Makela – baritone sax, bass clarinet
- Doug Morgan – baritone sax

=== Trumpets ===
- Brian MacDonald
- Mike Davis
- Mike Kamuf
- Rich Sigler
- Tim Leahey

=== Trombones ===
- Ben Patterson
- Jeff Martin
- Joe Jackson
- Jeff Cortazzo – bass trombone

=== Rhythm ===
- Shawn Purcell – guitar
- Bob Larson – piano
- John Pineda – bass
- Paul Henry – bass
- Steve Fidyk – drums

=== Production ===
- Bob Dawson – engineer, recording, mixing, producer
- Charlie Pilzer – mastering
- Joseph Magee – recording, mixing, producer
- Alan Baylock – producer
