= Vaughn Nark =

American jazz musician

Vaughn Nark is a trumpeter, flugelhornist, trombonist and exclusive Yamaha clinician from Washington, DC. With a career that includes nearly two decades as a member of the United States Air Force's Airmen of Note, Nark has performed with many of the world's finest artists and entertainers, including Dizzy Gillespie, Doc Severinsen, Tony Bennett, Louis Bellson, Henry Mancini, Arturo Sandoval, Stanley Turrentine, Slide Hampton, Lena Horne and Wynton Marsalis. He plays the Yamaha YTR-6335S trumpet.

== Biography ==
A native of Mt. Carmel, Pennsylvania, Nark began playing the trumpet at the age of six. His father Leon, also a trumpeter, was his first teacher. At seven, he was exposed to Dizzy Gillespie, Miles Davis, Maynard Ferguson, and Doc Severinsen. Soon after graduating from high school, Nark auditioned and was accepted by the United States Air Force Band in Washington, D.C., where he became a member of its premier jazz ensemble, the Airmen of Note. He occupied the lead and jazz trumpet chair for nearly 20 years, until his retirement in 1993. By Presidential Order, he was presented with the Meritorious Service Medal for his "distinctive accomplishments and contributions" while a member of this ensemble.

Since retiring from the Airmen of Note, Nark leads a quintet in the Washington, DC metropolitan area and travels extensively throughout the country and abroad, performing as guest artist at various club and jazz festival venues. He is an instructor for a summer jazz camp offered by the Landon School in Bethesda, Maryland. In addition, he gives private lessons and is a Yamaha clinician.

Nark has also performed as lead trumpet for the inaugural session of the Smithsonian Jazz Masterworks Orchestra conducted by Gunther Schuller and David Baker. He performed at the 1996 Summer Olympics in Atlanta, Georgia.
