= Joe Lacina =

American artist, curator, and designer (born 1985)

Joseph Lacina (born December 25, 1985) is an American artist, curator, and designer. Lacina currently lives and works in Grinnell, Iowa.

== About ==
Born in Iowa on December 25, 1985. Lacina attended Grinnell High School. He received a Bachelor of Fine Arts degree in Painting from the Maryland Institute College of Art (MICA) in 2008. After completing his undergraduate degree, he founded Grin City Collective in 2006, an artist residency program in Grinnell, Iowa. He also founded, Extra Extra (2009-2012), an art gallery and performance space located in Philadelphia, Pennsylvania.

He holds a Master of Fine Arts degree in sculpture from the University of Iowa.

His sculptural work has been exhibited work at LVL3 Gallery (Chicago IL), Ditch Projects (Springfield, OR), Make-It-Move, Northrup King Building (Minneapolis, MN) and at the Institute of Contemporary Art (Philadelphia, PA).
