= International Trombone Association =

The International Trombone Association is the largest association of trombonists with 4,000 members from 74 countries. Formed in 1972, ITA is a registered non-profit organization.

ITA undertakes numerous activities to further its mission:

- producing the quarterly magazine, ITA Journal
- presenting the annual International Trombone Festival – the world’s largest trombone festival
- organizing the ITA Solo & Ensemble Competitions and Composition Contest Competition
- endowing the ITA Award and Neill Humfeld Award
- publishing trombone sheet music through the ITA Press
- commissioning new trombone music from eminent composers
- managing the Assist an International Member membership sponsorship program
- publishing the ITA website
- promoting the Trombone through the annual International Trombone Week

== Presidents ==
- Tom Everett (1972-1976)
- Buddy Baker (1976-1978)
- Tom Ervin (1978-1980)
- Neill Humfeld (1980-1982)
- Irvin Wagner (1982-1984)
- Robert Gray (1984-1986)
- Steve Anderson (1986-1988)
- John Marcellus (1988-1990)
- Royce Lumpkin (1990-1992)
- Hugo Magliocco (1992-1994)
- Steve Wolfinbarger (1994-1996)
- Heinz Fadle (1996-1998)
- Paul Hunt (1998-2000)
- John Drew (2000-2002)
- Nathaniel Brickens (2002-2004)
- Denis Wick (2004-2006)
- Kenneth Hanlon (2006-2008)
- Don Lucas (2008-2011)
- Jiggs Whigham (2011-2014)
- Joseph Alessi (2014-2017)
- Ben van Dijk (2017-2020)
- Jacques Mauger (2020-2023)
- Carol Jarvis (2023-2026)

== See also ==
- Columbus State University
