= Summit Records =

- Founded: 1988
- Founder: David Hickman; Ralph Sauer
- Distributor: MVD Entertainment Group
- Genre: Various
- Country of origin: U.S.
- Location: Tempe, Arizona
- Official website: www.summitrecords.com

Summit Records, Inc. is an internationally distributed record label that evolved out of the large brass ensemble Summit Brass in the late 1980s. It was established by David Hickman and Ralph Sauer.

Four Summit Records recordings have been nominated for Grammy Awards, including The Manhattan Transfer Meets Tubby the Tuba in the Best Children's Album category, the Chicago Chamber Musicians were finalists in the Best Chamber Music Performance category, Pete McGuinness in the Best Instrumental Arrangement Accompanying Vocalist for his arrangement of "Smile", and The University of Miami Concert Jazz Bands' recording of "Three Romances" in the category of Best Instrumental Composition.

In 2006 Summit Records took over distributorship of MAMA Records, which was founded in 1990 by Gene Czerwinski, who also founded Cerwin-Vega. It has won three Grammy Awards, including Count Basie Orchestra, Bob Florence, and Randy Brecker.

== Roster ==
- Joseph Alessi
- American Brass Quintet
- Bill Anschell
- Daniel Asia
- Atlantic Brass Quintet
- Michael Conway Baker
- Count Basie Orchestra
- Jeanne Baxtresser
- Tom Brantley
- Randy Brecker
- Calliope
- Kevin Cobb
- Larry Combs
- Jack Cooper
- Les DeMerle
- Dixieland Ramblers
- Dorian Wind Quintet
- Duo46
- Eastman Wind Ensemble
- Extension Ensemble
- Tim Eyermann
- Philip Farkas
- Bob Florence
- David Friesen
- Mark Hetzler
- David Hickman
- Arnold Jacobs
- Stan Kenton Alumni Band
- Ted Kooshian
- Mark Lawrence
- Ronald Leonard
- Dave Liebman
- London Symphony Orchestra
- Matthias Lupri
- John Mack
- Dave MacKay
- The Manhattan Transfer
- Matrix
- Bob McChesney
- Rafael Méndez
- Fred Mills
- Tony Monaco
- Vaughn Nark
- New West Guitar Group
- Gene Pokorny
- River City Brass Band
- Scott Routenberg
- Ralph Sauer
- Carl Saunders
- Bobby Shew
- Phil Smith
- Clark Terry
- Robert Vernon
- Allen Vizzutti
- George Walker
- B.J. Ward
- Harry Watters
- Ken Watters
- Jiggs Whigham
- Anthony Wilson
- Gerald Wilson
- Michele Zukovsky
