= Mark Hetzler =

American musician

- Born: 1968 (age 56–57); Sarasota, Florida, U.S.
- Genres: Classical, Jazz
- Occupation(s): Trombonist, pedagogue, educator
- Instrument: Trombone
- Years active: 1986–present

Mark Hetzler (born 1968 in Sarasota, Florida) is an American trombonist and former member of the Empire Brass Quintet. Hetzler has performed with the Minnesota Orchestra, Boston Pops, Hartford Symphony Orchestra, Springfield Symphony Orchestra, Florida Orchestra, and the Boston Symphony Orchestra. As a member of the Empire Brass Quintet from 1996–2012, he performed in recital and as a soloist with symphony orchestras in Australia, Taiwan, Korea, China, Venezuela, Brazil, Japan, Hong Kong, Germany, Italy, Austria, Malaysia, Singapore, Switzerland, Bermuda, St. Bartholomew and across the United States. He appeared with the Empire Brass Quintet on live television and radio broadcasts in Asia and the United States. He is on several of the critically acclaimed Empire Brass CDs on the Telarc label, including Firedance, The Glory of Gabrieli, and a recording of Baroque music for Brass and Organ. Hetzler has recorded ten solo albums released on Summit Records; he has also recorded for the Arista Records label.

Hetzler received a bachelor's degree in music from Boston University and a master's degree from the New England Conservatory of Music. From 2000 – 2004, Hetzler was a faculty member at Florida International University where he ran the trombone studio. In addition, he was also a professor at Lynn University in Boca Raton, Florida. At Lynn, he ran the trombone studio and taught music appreciation. Currently, Hetzler is a professor in the School of Music at the University of Wisconsin–Madison, where he continues to teach trombone and performs with the resident quintet.

== Discography ==
- American Voices
- Serious Songs, Sad Faces
- 20th Century Architects
- American Voices II
- Sonatas, Dynamic Elements
- Three Views
- Blues, Ballads and Beyond
