= Della Reese discography =

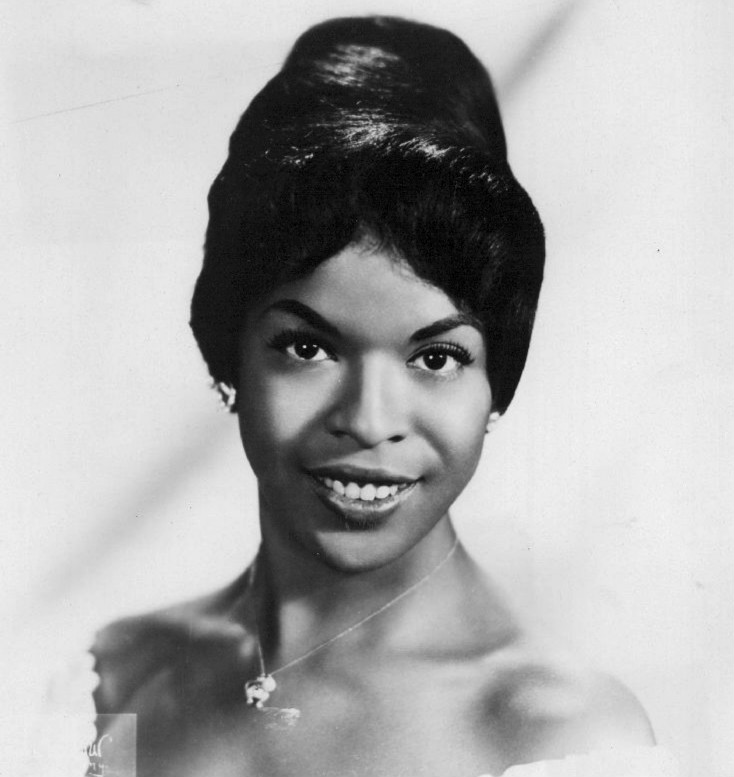
- Della Reese in 1961
- Studio albums: 21
- Live albums: 8
- Compilation albums: 8
- Video albums: 2
- Other charted songs: 1
- Lead singles: 52
- Collaborative singles: 2
- Promotional singles: 2

As a recording artist, Della Reese has made 21 studio albums, eight live albums, two video albums, eight compilation albums and one other charted song. Of her singles, 52 were released with Reese serving as the lead artist, while two were released with Reese serving as a collaborative artist. Two additional singles were issued as promotional singles. Reese's first recording was the 1954 single "Yes Indeed". Her first studio album appeared in 1956 on Jubilee Records called Melancholy Baby. In 1957, Reese had her first chart single with the top 20 US and Australian song "And That Reminds Me". The Jubilee label issued three more studio efforts by Reese: Amen! (1958), The Story of the Blues (1959) and What Do You Know About Love? (1959).

On the RCA Victor label, Reese had her highest-charting single with 1959's "Don't You Know?". The song reached number two on the US Hot 100 and number two on the US R&B chart. It was followed by the US and Australian top 20 single "Not One Minute More". Her first RCA Victor studio album was issued in 1960 titled Della. It was her highest-peaking album, reaching number 35 in the US. Her second charting album followed in 1961 titled Special Delivery. RCA Victor released several more studio efforts through 1965 including The Classic Della (1962) and Waltz with Me, Della (1963). Four more of Reese's singles made the US Hot 100 chart through 1961 including "Someday (You'll Want Me to Want You)" (1960) and "Won'cha Come Home Bill Bailey" (1961).

During the 1960s, RCA Victor also released two live albums: Della Reese on Stage (1962) and Della Reese at Basin Street East (1964). At ABC Records, Della Reese Live made the US album chart in 1966. In 1965, Reese's single "After Loving You" made the US Hot 100 and adult contemporary charts. Its corresponding studio effort C'mon and Hear Della Reese! was issued on ABC Records. The label released three more studio albums of Reese's material through 1968. Her first with Avco Embassy Records was 1969's "Games People Play". Its corresponding album Black Is Beautiful made the US R&B albums chart. Under various labels, Reese issued three more studio albums in the 1970s and two more in the 1980s. In the 1990s, Reese released two live albums. Her final album was the 2006 studio effort Give It to God.

== Albums ==
=== Studio albums ===
List of studio albums, with selected chart positions, and other relevant details
Title	Album details	Peak chart positions	
Title	Album details	US	US R&B
Melancholy Baby	Released: 1956; Label: Jubilee; Formats: LP	—	—
Amen! (with her Meditation Singers)	Released: November 1958; Label: Jubilee; Formats: LP	—	—
The Story of the Blues	Released: 1959; Label: Jubilee; Formats: LP	—	—
What Do You Know About Love?	Released: 1959; Label: Jubilee; Formats: LP	—	—
Della	Released: January 1960; Label: RCA Victor; Formats: LP	35	—
Della by Starlight	Released: May 1960; Label: RCA Victor; Formats: LP	—	—
Della Della Cha-Cha-Cha	Released: November 1960; Label: RCA Victor; Formats: LP	—	—
Special Delivery	Released: August 1961; Label: RCA Victor; Formats: LP	113	—
The Classic Della	Released: January 1962; Label: RCA Victor; Formats: LP	94	—
Waltz with Me, Della	Released: August 1963; Label: RCA Victor; Formats: LP	—	—
Moody	Released: January 1965; Label: RCA Victor; Formats: LP	—	—
C'mon and Hear Della Reese!	Released: August 1965; Label: ABC–Paramount Records; Formats: LP	—	—
"i like it like dat!"	Released: February 1966; Label: ABC–Paramount; Formats: LP	—	—
Della on Strings of Blue	Released: September 1967; Label: ABC; Formats: LP	—	—
I Gotta Be Me...This Trip Out	Released: June 1968; Label: ABC; Formats: LP	—	—
Black Is Beautiful	Released: January 1970; Label: Avco Embassy; Formats: LP	—	44
Right Now	Released: November 1970; Label: Avco Embassy; Formats: LP	—	—
Let Me in Your Life	Released: October 1973; Label: LMI; Formats: LP	—	—
Sure Like Lovin' You	Released: 1983; Label: Applause; Formats: LP, cassette	—	—
Della Reese and Brilliance (with Brilliance)	Released: 1986; Label: Atlanta International; Formats: LP	—	—
Give It to God	Released: September 22, 2006; Label: Spiritual Icon; Formats: CD, digital	—	—
"—" denotes a recording that did not chart or was not released in that territory.

=== Live albums ===
List of live albums, with selected chart positions, and other relevant details
Title	Album details	Peak chart positions
Title	Album details	US
A Date with Della Reese at Mr. Kelly's in Chicago	Released: 1958; Label: Jubilee; Formats: LP	—
Della on Stage	Released: 1962; Label: RCA Victor; Formats: LP	—
Della Reese at Basin Street East	Released: 1964; Label: RCA Victor; Formats: LP	—
Della Reese Live	Released: August 1966; Label: ABC–Paramount; Formats: LP	149
One More Time! Recorded Live at the Playboy Club	Released: 1966; Label: ABC; Formats: LP	—
One of a Kind (with The Jazz A La Carte Players)	Released: 1979; Label: Jazz a La Carte; Formats: LP	—
Some of My Best Friends Are the Blues	Released: 1995; Label: Lett; Formats: CD	—
My Soul Feels Better Right Now	Released: June 30, 1998; Label: Homeland; Formats: CD, cassette	—
"—" denotes a recording that did not chart or was not released in that territory.

=== Video albums ===
List of video albums, showing all relevant details
Title	Album details
In Concert (with Mel Tormé)	Released: 1981; Label: MCA DiscoVision; Formats: LaserDisc
An Evening With Tito Puente and Della Reese (with Tito Puente)	Released: 2010; Label: Kultur; Formats: DVD

=== Compilation albums ===
List of compilation albums, showing all relevant details
Title	Album details
And That Reminds Me	Released: 1959; Label: Jubilee; Format: LP
The Best of Della Reese	Released: 1962; Label: Jubilee; Format: LP
The Best of Della Reese	Released: 1972; Label: RCA Victor; Format: LP
The ABC Collection	Released: 1976; Label: ABC; Format: LP
Voice of an Angel	Released: September 17, 1996; Label: BMG/RCA/Sony; Format: CD
And That Reminds Me: The Jubilee Years	Released: 1996; Label: Collectors' Choice; Format: CD
The Collection	Released: April 21, 1998; Label: Varèse Sarabande; Format: CD
Legendary Della Reese	Released: August 5, 2003; Label: BMG; Format: CD

== Singles ==
List of singles, with selected chart positions, showing other relevant details
Title	Year	Peak chart positions					Album
Title	Year	US	US AC	US R&B	AUS	CAN	Album
"Yes Indeed"	1954	—	—	—	—	—	—N/a
"In the Still of the Night"	1955	—	—	—	—	—	—N/a
"Time After Time"	1955	—	—	—	—	—	—N/a
"My Melancholy Baby"	1956	—	—	—	—	—	Melancholy Baby
"Years from Now"	1956	—	—	—	—	—	—N/a
"Headin' Home"	1956	—	—	—	—	—	—N/a
"In the Meantime"	1956	—	—	—	—	—	—N/a
"And That Reminds Me"	1957	12	—	—	15	5	—N/a
"I Only Want to Love You"	1957	—	—	—	—	—	—N/a
"If Not for You"	1958	—	—	—	—	—	—N/a
"C'mon C'mon"	1958	—	—	—	—	—	—N/a
"I Wish"	1958	—	—	—	—	—	—N/a
"You're Just in Love" (with Kirk Stuart)	1958	—	—	—	—	—	—N/a
"Sermonette"	1958	99	—	—	—	—	—N/a
"Once Upon a Dream"	1959	—	—	—	—	—	—N/a
"I'm Nobody's Baby"	1959	—	—	—	—	—	What Do You Know About Love?
"Don't You Know?"	1959	2	—	1	—	—	The Classic Della
"Not One Minute More"	1959	16	—	12	14	—	—N/a
"The Lady Is a Tramp"	1960	—	—	—	—	—	Della
"Someday (You'll Want Me to Want You)"	1960	56	—	—	—	—	Della
"Everyday"	1960	—	—	—	—	—	—N/a
"And Now"	1960	69	—	—	89	—	—N/a
"The Most Beautiful Words"	1960	67	—	—	—	—	—N/a
"Won'cha Come Home, Bill Bailey"	1961	98	—	—	—	—	Special Delivery
"A Far Far Better Thing"	1961	— (Note: "A Far, Far Better Thing" did not enter the Hot 100, but peaked at number 15 on Bubbling Under Hot 100 Singles, which acts as a 25-song extension of the Hot 100)	—	—	—	—	—N/a
"Gone"	1961	—	—	—	—	—	The Classic Della
"Ninety Nine and 1/2 Won't Do" (with The Meditation Singers)	1962	—	—	—	—	—	—N/a
"Rome Adventure"	1962	—	—	—	—	—	—N/a
"Blow Out the Sun"	1962	—	—	—	—	—	—N/a
"As Long as He Needs Me"	1962	—	—	—	—	—	—N/a
"Be My Love"	1963	—	—	—	—	—	—N/a
"More"	1963	—	—	—	91	—	—N/a
"Angel D'Amore"	1963	—	—	—	—	—	—N/a
"The Bottom of Old Smokey"	1964	—	—	—	—	—	—N/a
"If I Didn't Care"	1964	—	—	—	—	—	—N/a
"After Loving You"	1965	95	21	—	—	—	C'mon and Hear Della Reese!
"And That Reminds Me" (Note: The 1965 version of "And That Reminds Me" was a re-recorded version.)	1965	—	—	—	—	—	—N/a
"'Tain't Nobody's Bizness If I Do"	1966	—	—	—	—	—	"i like it like dat!"
"If It's the Last Thing I Do"	1966	—	—	—	—	—	"i like it like dat!"
"It Was a Very Good Year"	1966	99	—	—	—	—	—N/a
"Sunny"	1966	—	—	—	—	—	—N/a
"Every Other Day"	1967	—	—	—	—	—	—N/a
"I Heard You Cried Last Night"	1967	—	—	—	—	—	Della on Strings of Blue
"Sorry Baby"	1967	—	—	—	—	—	—N/a
"I Gotta Be Me"	1968	—	—	—	—	—	I Gotta Be Me...This Trip Out
"Games People Play"	1969	— (Note: "Games People Play" did not enter the Hot 100, but peaked at number 21 on Bubbling Under Hot 100 Singles, which acts as a 25-song extension of the Hot 100.)	—	—	—	—	Black Is Beautiful
"Simple Song of Freedom"	1970	—	—	—	—	—	Right Now
"Billy My Love"	1970	—	—	—	—	—	Right Now
"If It Feels Good Do It"	1971	—	—	—	—	—	—N/a
"The Troublemaker"	1971	—	—	—	—	—	—N/a
"I Believe in Music"	1971	—	—	—	—	—	—N/a
"Let Me in Your Life"	1973	—	—	—	—	—	Let Me in Your Life
"(If Loving You Is Wrong) I Don't Want to Be Right"	1973	—	—	—	—	—	Let Me in Your Life
"Nothing Like a True Love"	1977	—	—	—	—	—	—N/a
"—" denotes a recording that did not chart or was not released in that territory.

== Promotional singles ==
List of promotional singles, showing all relevant details
Title	Year	Album	Ref.
"Lover Man (Oh, Where Can You Be?)"	1958	The Story of the Blues	
"Comes Once in a Lifetime"	1962	Della on Stage	

== Other charted songs ==
List of songs, with selected chart positions, showing other relevant details
Title	Year	Peak chart positions	Album	Notes
Title	Year	US Bubbling	Album	Notes
"Compared to What"	1969	28	Black Is Beautiful	(Note: B-side to the single "Games People Play".)
