= Let Me in Your Life (Della Reese album) =

Studio album by Della Reese
- Released: October 1973
- Recorded: October 1972
- Studio: TTG Studios
- Genre: Pop; R&B
- Label: LMI
- Producer: Lee Magid

Della Reese chronology
Right Now (1970)	Let Me in Your Life (1973)	One of a Kind (1979)

Singles from Let Me in Your Life
- 1. "Let Me in Your Life" Released: 1973; 2. "(If Loving You Is Wrong) I Don't Want to Be Right" Released: 1973

Let Me in Your Life is a studio album by American singer, Della Reese. It was released in October 1973 by LMI Records, a company formed by Reese's manager, Lee Magid. The album was the first release for the company, who also included two singles by Reese: the title track and "(If Loving You Is Wrong) I Don't Want to Be Right". It received promotion from different outlets based on its initial success and was given a positive review by Cash Box magazine.

== Background ==
Della Reese was later known for a career in television and acting, but she first gained international recognition as a singer of blues, gospel, jazz and pop. With the help of agent, Lee Magid, she signed her first recording contract in 1954 which led to a successful recording career with the top singles "And That Reminds Me" and "Don't You Know?". Reese continued recording into the 1970s but with less frequency. In September 1973, it was announced that Lee Magid had formed his own record company titled LMI Records and his first product for his company would be Reese's next studio album, Let Me in Your Life.

== Recording and content ==
According to the liner notes, Let Me in Your Life was recorded in three sessions in 1972: October 4, October 6 and October 9. Sessions were held at TTG Studios, located in Los Angeles, California with Magid serving as the album's producer. Let Me in Your Life consisted of nine tracks, several of which were R&B cover songs like "Bein' Green", "Funny" and two songs by Bill Withers (the title track and "Who Is She and What Is She to You"). In addition several songs were compiled together to make "medleys" in the following tracks: "Fire and Rain/Bye Bye Love" and "Never Can Say Goodbye/Let's Stay Together".

== Release, promotion, critical reception and singles ==
Let Me in Your Life was released by LMI Records in October 1973 and was distributed as a vinyl LP with five songs on each side of the disc. According to an article from Cash Box magazine, the LP was a "success", leading to LMI adding several distributors to help issue the album to various outlets in Hawaii, Connecticut, and Vermont. Let Me in Your Life received a positive response from Cash Box who named it among its "Pop Best Bets" in October 1973. "he lovely and soulful Ms. Reese has done it again! Always a master of style and grace, Della has a hit LP on her hands," the publication wrote. They further praised the title track, calling it "excellent". Two singles were part of the product that were both issued in 1973: the title track and "(If Loving You Is Wrong) I Don't Want to Be Right".

== Track listing ==
Side one
No.	Title	Writer(s)	Length
1.	"Let Me in Your Life"	B. Withers	4:25
2.	"Lay Baby Lay"	B. Dylan	4:16
3.	"If Loving You Is Wrong"	H. Banks; R. Jackson; C. Hampton	3:47
4.	"Being Green"	J. Raposo	3:48
5.	"Let's Start All Over Again"	B. Johnson	3:10

Side two
No.	Title	Writer(s)	Length
1.	"Fire and Rain/Bye Bye Love"	J. Taylor; F. & B. Bryant	5:30
2.	"Never Can Say Goodbye/Let's Stay Together"	C. Davis; Mitchell; Green; Jackson	4:15
3.	"Funny"	Neil; Broughton; Prince	4:52
4.	"Who Is She and What Is She to You"	B. Withers; S. McKenny	3:20

== Release history ==
Release history and formats for Let Me in Your Life
Region	Date	Format	Label	Ref.
Various	October 1974	Vinyl LP	LMI Records	
Various	October 1974	Vinyl LP	People Records; R&T Records	
