= Della Reese filmography =

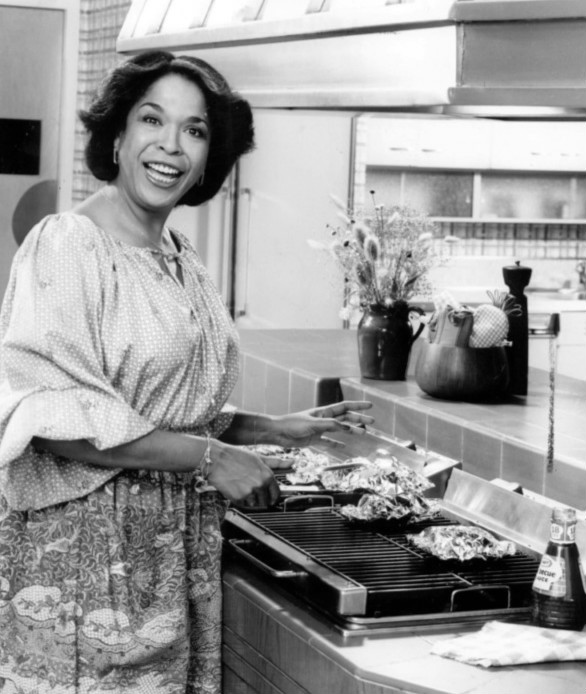
Della Reese preparing for a commercial with Kraft Foods in 1977.

As an actress, Della Reese has made appearances in films, television films and television series. She made her first television appearance in a 1968 episode of The Mod Squad. Her first television film was released in 1973 titled Voyage of the Yes. In 1975, she made her first film appearance as Mrs. Gibson in Psychic Killer. During the 1970s and 1980s, Reese acted in television series and television films. This includes 1976's Nightmare in Badham County, five episodes of It Takes Two and 27 episodes of Chico and the Man. In 1989, she appeared as Vera Walker in the film Harlem Nights.

Between 1991 and 1992, Reese appeared in the short-lived television series The Royal Family. In 1994, Reese portrayed Tess in the series Touched by an Angel. The show ran for the next ten years and Reese received nominations for her role from the Emmy Awards and the Golden Globe Awards. She also won several accolades from the NAACP Image Awards for her role. In the late 1990s, Reese appeared in series of television films including Emma's Wish and Anya's Bell. During this period, she also made six appearances in the show Promised Land. Reese continued acting through the 2000s and the early part of the 2010s. Among her film appearances of this period was 2005's Beauty Shop and 2010's Expecting Mary. Her final filmography credit was in a 2014 episode of Signed, Sealed, Delivered.

== Film ==
List of film appearances by Della Reese, showing all relevant details
Title	Year	Role	Ref.
Psychic Killer	1975	Mrs. Gibson	
Harlem Nights	1989	Vera Walker	
A Thin Line Between Love and Hate	1996	Ma Wright	
Dinosaur	2000	Eema (voice)	
Beauty Shop	2005	Mrs. Towner	
If I Had Known I Was a Genius	2007	Nana	
Expecting Mary	2010	Doris Dorkus	
Meant to Be	2012	Mave	
Me Again	2012	Muriel	

== Television films ==
List of film appearances by Della Reese, showing all relevant details
Title	Year	Role	Ref.
Voyage of the Yes	1973	Opal Parker	
Daddy's Girl	1973	Diane	
Twice in a Lifetime	1974	Flo	
Cop on the Beat	1975	Claudine	
Flo's Place	1976	Flo	
Nightmare in Badham County	1976	Sarah	
The Kid Who Loved Christmas	1990	Alicia Slater	
You Must Remember This	1992	Ella DuChamps	Voice
A Match Made in Heaven	1997	Katie Beale	
Miracle in the Woods	1997	Lilly Cooper	
Emma's Wish	1998	Mona Washburn	
Mama Flora's Family	1998	Nana Fleming	
The Secret Path (Chasing Secrets)	1999	Honey	
Having Our Say: The Delany Sisters First 100 Years	1999	Martha Logan	
Anya's Bell	1999	Anya Herpick	
The Moving of Sophia Myles	2000	Sophia Myles	
Hallelujah	2011	Dulcie Prejean	
Christmas Angel	2012	Elsie Waybright	
Dear Secret Santa	2013	Linda	
Miracle at Gate 213	2013	Alma Peddington	

== Television series ==
List of television series appearances by Della Reese, showing all relevant details
Title	Year	Role	Notes	Ref.
The Mod Squad	1968	Paula	Episode: "Find Tara Chapman!"	
Della	1969–1970	Herself (host)	197 episodes	
The Bold Ones: The New Doctors	1970	Grace Dayton	Episode: "Killer on the Loose"	
Police Woman	1974	Tina Thompson	Episode: "Requiem for Bored Wives"	
McCloud	1974–1976	Police Sgt. Gladys Harris	2 episodes	
Petrocelli	1975	Angela Damon	Episode: "Once Upon a Victim"	
The Rookies	1975	Landers	Episode: "Ladies Day"	
Sanford and Son	1975	Herself	Episode: "Della, Della, Della"	
Chico and the Man	1975–1978	Della Rogers	27 episodes	
Medical Center	1976	Capt. Sykes	Episode: "Major Annie, MD"	
Welcome Back, Kotter	1979	Mrs. Tremaine	Episodes: "Come Back, Little Arnold", "The Gang Show"	
Insight	1980	Judge Roberta Lynn	Episode: "God in the Dock"	
The Love Boat	1982	Millie Washington	2 episodes	
It Takes Two	1982–1983	Judge Caroline Phillips	5 episodes	
The A-Team	1985	Mrs. Baracus	Episode: "Lease with an Option to Die"	
Crazy Like a Fox	1985–1986	Nurse Flood	3 episodes	
Charlie & Co.	1986	Aunt Rachel	4 episodes	
ABC Afterschool Special	1986	Aunt Faith	Episode: "The Gift of Amazing Grace"	
227	1987–1990	Rita Clark / Grace	2 episodes	
Night Court	1989	Aunt Ruth	Episode: "Auntie Maim"	
The Young Riders	1990	Stagecoach Sally	Episode: "Born to Hang"	
MacGyver	1990–1991	Mama Colton	2 episodes	
Married People	1991	Annette	Episode: "Dance Ten, Friends Zero"	
The Royal Family	1991–1992	Victoria Royal	15 episodes	
Dream On	1992	Receptionist	Episode: "No Deposit, No Return"	
Designing Women	1993	Mrs. Toussant	Episode: "Wedding Redux"	
L.A. Law	1993	Lucille Lake	Episode: "Vindaloo in the Villows"	
Picket Fences	1993	Naomi Grand	Episode: "The Lullaby League"	
Touched by an Angel	1994–2003	Tess	211 episodes NAACP Image Award for Outstanding Actress in a Drama Series (1998–2002); Nominated—Golden Globe Award for Best Supporting Actress – Series, Miniseries or Television Film; Nominated—Primetime Emmy Award for Outstanding Supporting Actress in a Drama Series (1997–98); Nominated—Screen Actors Guild Award for Outstanding Performance by a Female Actor in a Drama Series (1997–98)	
Promised Land	1996–1998	Tess	6 episodes	
Happily Ever After: Fairy Tales for Every Child	1997	The Blues Fairy (voice)	Episode: "Pinocchio"	
That's So Raven	2006	Miss Rhonnie Wilcox	Episode: "The Four Aces"	
The Young and the Restless	2009	Aunt Virginia	2 episodes	
Detroit 1-8-7	2010	Lorraine Henderson	Episode: "Shelter"	
Signed, Sealed, Delivered	2014	Cora Brandt	2 episodes	
