= The Classic Della =

Studio album by Della Reese
- Released: January 1962
- Studio: RCA Studio A (New York)
- Genre: Classical; pop
- Label: RCA Victor
- Producer: Hugo and Luigi

Della Reese chronology
Special Delivery (1961)	The Classic Della (1962)	Della Reese at Basin Street East (1962)

Singles from The Classic Della
- 1. "Don't You Know?" Released: August 1959; 2. "Gone" Released: November 1961

The Classic Della is the ninth studio album by American singer Della Reese, released by RCA Victor in January, 1962. The LP consisted of 12 tracks, all of which were vocal adaptations of classical pieces by composers including Tchaikovsky and Schubert. The album received mostly positive reviews following its release. The Classic Della made the US Billboard 200 chart and included Reese's most commercially successful single release: "Don't You Know?".

== Background ==
Later known for an acting career that included starring in the TV series, Touched by an Angel, Della Reese first forged a career as a singer of blues, jazz, and pop. Her first major music success was with the 1957 million-selling single, "And That Reminds Me". It led to a contract with RCA Victor, where Reese had her greatest success as a singer with 1959's "Don't You Know?". The song was adapted from "Musetta's Waltz", which derived from the opera, La Bohème. "Don't You Know" served as the inspiration for The Classic Della, with the idea of having Reese record classical instrumentals into vocal pieces.

== Recording and content ==
The Classic Della was cut in recording sessions held at RCA Studio A, located in New York City. It was produced by the recording team Hugo & Luigi and featured classical arrangements by Glenn Osser. The Hugo & Luigi pair produced Reese's previous four studio albums for RCA Victor. The Classic Della was a collection of 12 tracks, all of which were adapted from classical music pieces. Included were pieces by Tchaikovsky ("Symphony No. 6," "Melodie Op. 42"), Debussy ("Reverie"), Schubert ("Serenade"), Chopin ("Etude in E, Op. 10 No. 3," "Polonaise No. 6 Op. 53"). The liner notes gave credit to all of the original composers and included the titles of the pieces they originated from.

== Release and critical reception ==
Professional ratings
Review scores
Source	Rating
Allmusic	4/5 stars

The Classic Della was released by the RCA Victor label in January 1962 and was Reese's ninth studio album (her fourth for RCA). The album was offered as a vinyl LP (distributed in mono and stereo formats) with six tracks on each side of the disc. The album received mostly positive responses from critics. Cash Box magazine wrote, "Della Reese demonstrates her stature as a major artist in this Victor offering which showcases her talents singing modem adaptations of the works of Tchaikovsky, Chopin, Debussy and others." Charles Schreiber of The Montreal Gazette newspaper praised Reese's performances and called the Glenn Osser arrangements "outstanding". Will Friedwald, author of the book A Biographical Guide to the Great Jazz and Pop Singers, called it "a fairly dispensable album" when describing her RCA discography. John Bush of AllMusic gave it a four out of five star rating, writing, "Fortunately, Della Reese's voice -- as strong, controlled, and pitch-perfect as it had proven in the past -- is up to the challenge of such heavy material."

== Chart performance and singles ==
The Classic Della rose to the number 94 position on the US Billboard 200 albums chart in early 1962. It was Reese's third album to make the chart (only one more LP would reach the Billboard 200 in 1966). It was Reese's second highest-charting LP on the Billboard 200, preceded by Della, which rose into the top 40. The album was preceded by the single, "Don't You Know", which RCA Victor first issued in August 1959. The single rose to number two on the US Billboard Hot 100 and number one on the Billboard R&B songs chart that year. The Classic Della later spawned "Gone" as a single in November 1961.

== Track listing ==
Side one
No.	Title	Writer(s)	Length
1.	"The Story of a Starry Night" (adapted from Tchaikovsky: Symphony No. 6 in B Minor, Op. 74 [1st movement])	Hoffman; Curtis; Livingston	2:45
2.	"These Are the Things I Love" (adapted from Tchaikovsky: Mélodie, Op 42, No. 3)	Barlow; Harris	3:30
3.	"If You Are But a Dream" (adapted from Rubinstein: "Romance")	Bonx; Fulton; Jaffe	3:01
4.	"My Reverie" (adapted from Debussy: "Rêverie")	Larry Clinton	3:32
5.	"Take My Heart" (adapted from Ketèlbey: "In a Persian Market")	Ketelbey; Creatore; Peretti; Wess	2:37
6.	"Stranger in Paradise" (adapted from Borodin: "Polovetzian Dances")	Forrest; Wright	2:58

Side two
No.	Title	Writer(s)	Length
1.	"Gone" (adapted from Drigo: "Serenade")	Peretti; Creatore; Weiss	2:33
2.	"Serenade" (adapted from Schubert: "Serenade")	Peretti; Creatore; Weiss	3:19
3.	"Moon Love" (adapted from Tchaikovsky: Symphony No. 5 in E Minor, Op. 64 [2nd movement])	David; Davis; Kostelanetz	2:50
4.	"Softly My Love" (adapted from Chopin: Etude in E, Op. 10, No. 3)	Bennett; Tepper	2:38
5.	"Till the End of Time" (adapted from Chopin: Polonaise No. 6 in A-Flat, Op. 53)	Kaye; Mossman	3:14
6.	"Don't You Know?" (adapted from Puccini: La bohème: "Musetta's Waltz")	Bobby Worth	2:28

== Personnel ==
All credits are adapted from the liner notes of The Classic Della.

- Ernest Oelrich – Recording engineer
- Hugo & Luigi – Producer
- Mike Ludlow – Illustration
- Glenn Osser – Arranger and conductor

== Charts ==
=== Weekly charts ===
Chart (1962)	Peak position
US Billboard 200	94

== Release history ==
Release history and formats for The Classic Della
Region	Date	Format	Label	Ref.
Various	January 1962	Vinyl LP (mono); vinyl LP (stereo)	RCA Victor	
Various	1969	Vinyl LP (stereo)	RCA Victor	
Australia	1973	Vinyl LP (stereo)	RCA Camden	
United Kingdom	1980	Vinyl LP; cassette	RCA International	
Australia	1980	Vinyl LP	RCA Camden	
Australia	1984	Compact disc	RCA Victor	
Germany	1993	Compact disc	RCA Victor	
Japan	April 1999	Compact disc	BMG; RCA Records	
Japan	July 2004	Compact disc	BMG; RCA Records	
Various	circa 2020	Music download; streaming	RCA Records	
