= Special Delivery (Della Reese album) =

Studio album by Della Reese
- Released: August 1961
- Studio: RCA Studios (California)
- Genre: Pop; swing
- Label: RCA Victor
- Producer: Hugo & Luigi

Della Reese chronology
Della Della Cha-Cha-Cha (1960)	Special Delivery (1961)	The Classic Della (1962)

Singles from Special Delivery
- 1. "Won'cha Come Home, Bill Bailey" Released: March 1961

Special Delivery is the eighth studio album by American singer Della Reese, released in August 1961 by RCA Victor. The album consisted of 12 recordings Reese had been performing on-tour, including "Won'cha Come Home, Bill Bailey", the project's only single release. Special Delivery was met with mostly positive reception from critics following its original release. It also made the US Billboard 200 albums chart in 1961.

== Background, recording and content ==
Della Reese found success as a singer recording in the styles of blues, jazz, and pop. Her first commercial success was with the 1957 single "And That Reminds Me", and would be followed by the 1959 top-selling release "Don't You Know?". The latter was her first with the RCA Victor label and Reese went on to record there for several years under the production of the Hugo & Luigi team. She recorded several swing-flavored LPs for the label, including Special Delivery. The album was recorded at the RCA Victor Studios in Hollywood, California, with the Hugo & Luigi team producing the project. Mercer Ellington conducted the string arrangements and featured his band. The album was a collection of 12 tracks that Reese had been performing on-tour throughout the United States. Among the album's covers were "Won'cha Come Home, Bill Bailey", "Have You Ever Been Lonely?", "I'm Always Chasing Rainbows", and "You're Nobody till Somebody Loves You".

== Release and critical reception ==
Special Delivery was released in August 1961 by the RCA Victor label and was her seventh studio album. It was distributed as a vinyl LP, offered in both mono and stereo formats. Six selections were featured on each side of the disc. A re-issued version of the project was released via compact disc in February 2017 by the Sepia label and featured ten additional tracks not originally issued on the first album. The album was met with positive reception following its release. Cash Box magazine named it one of their "Popular Picks of the Week" in early September 1961, calling it her "best album to date". Furthermore, they concluded, "Exciting LP fare that will stand the songstress in good stead for new fans." The St. Petersburg Times wrote that Reese's "big natural voice is powerfully potent" in many of the album's selections. Although no written review was provided, AllMusic rated the album two out of five possible stars.

== Chart performance and singles ==
Special Delivery was Reese's second album to make the US Billboard 200 albums chart, rising to the number 113 position in 1961. It was one of four LP's by Reese to make the Billboard 200 list through 1966. The album included one single's whose release preceded the album: "Won'cha Come Home, Bill Bailey". The original single was released in March 1961 by RCA Victor and was backed on the B-side with "The Touch of Your Lips". The single made the US Hot 100 chart, peaking at the number 98 position in 1961, becoming her eighth song to reach the chart.

== Track listing ==
Side one
No.	Title	Writer(s)	Length
1.	"Won'cha Come Home, Bill Bailey" (arranger Della Reese and Mercer Ellington)	Hughie Cannon	3:05
2.	"You Made Me Love You (I Didn't Want to Do It)"	McCarthy; Monaco	2:55
3.	"I Used to Love You (But It's All Over Now)"	Brown; Von Tilzer	2:02
4.	"Have You Ever Been Lonely?"	DeRose; Brown	2:48
5.	"Until the Real Thing Comes Along"	Holiner; Nichols; Cahn; Chaplin; Freeman	3:35
6.	"Please Don't Talk About Me When I'm Gone"	Stept; Clare	2:08

Side two
No.	Title	Writer(s)	Length
1.	"Three O'Clock in the Morning"	Terriss; Robledo	3:05
2.	"I'm Always Chasing Rainbows"	Carroll; McCarthy	3:18
3.	"What's the Reason I'm Not Pleasin' You"	Poe; Grier; Tomlin; Hatch	2:35
4.	"You're Nobody 'Til Somebody Loves You"	Morgan; Stock; Cavanaugh	3:05
5.	"I'm Just a Lucky So-and-So"	David; Ellington	2:40
6.	"Someday Sweetheart"	John and Benjamin Spikes	3:40

== Personnel ==
All credits are adapted from the liner notes of Special Delivery.

- Mercer Ellington – Arranger, conductor
- Hugo & Luigi – Producer
- Al Schmitt – Recording engineer

== Charts ==
=== Weekly charts ===
Chart (1961)	Peak position
US Billboard 200	113

== Release history ==
Release history and formats for Special Delivery
Region	Date	Format	Label	Ref.
Various	August 1961	Vinyl LP (mono); Vinyl LP (stereo)	RCA Victor	
Japan	Circa 1977	Vinyl LP (stereo)	RCA Records	
United Kingdom	February 10, 2017	Compact disc	Sepia Records	
