= Della on Strings of Blue =

Studio album by Della Reese
- Released: September 1967
- Studio: United Recording Corp. (Hollywood)
- Genre: Jazz
- Label: ABC
- Producer: Lee Magid

Della Reese chronology
Della Reese Live (1966)	Della on Strings of Blue (1967)	I Gotta Be Me...This Trip Out (1968)

Singles from Della on Strings of Blue
- 1. "I Heard You Cried Last Night" Released: July 1967

Della on Strings of Blue is a studio album by American singer, Della Reese. It was released by ABC Records in September 1967 and was her third studio LP with the record label. The album was a collection of 12 tracks performed in a jazz style like "I Heard You Cried Last Night" (the album's only single) and "Walking by the River". It received a positive reception by music publications and critics alike.

== Background ==
Later known for her career as a television actress on the series Touched by an Angel, Della Reese first had an established career as a singer and recording artist. She was known for her material in the genres of blues, jazz, gospel and pop. She had commercial success with singles like 1959's "Don't You Know?" and 1960's "Not One Minute More" (recorded under the RCA Victor label). Reese then signed with the ABC–Paramount label in 1965 and recorded four more studio albums, among them Della on Strings of Blue. The idea for the LP was crafted by Lee Magid, Reese's record producer and manager. He presented the idea to ABC's president, Bob Thiele, who agreed to its creation.

== Recording and content ==
According to the liner notes, Della on Strings of Blue was recorded at United Recording Corporation in Hollywood, California, in three separate sessions held on June 15, 16 and 17 of 1967. Magid served as the album's sole record producer and featured arrangements designed by Sid Feller, who was known for arranging Ray Charles's Jazz-influenced LP's at the ABC label. The LP was a collection of 12 tracks that were mainly cover tunes of standards from decades prior. Among the album's covers was some songs originally from the World War II era like "I Heard You Cried Last Night" and "Walking by the River". Other cover songs featured are June Christy's "Something Cool" and Lena Horne's version of "A House Is Not a Home".

== Release, critical reception and singles ==
Della on Strings of Blue was released by ABC Records in September 1967 and was her third studio album with the company. It was distributed as a vinyl LP (offered in both mono and stereo editions) with six selections on each side of the disc. The LP was given positive reviews by music publications and critics. Cash Box magazine named it one of their "Jazz Picks" and wrote that "Jazz fans in particular should be captivated by the LP." Chick Ober of the St. Petersburg Times called the album "a winner" and further said, "It may be my imagination, but it seems to the writer that Della Reese is singing better than ever these days." Will Friedwald (author of the book A Biographical Guide to the Great Jazz and Pop Singers) named it "the best studio albums from this period", which was in reference to her ABC LP's. One single was included on the LP: "I Heard You Cried Last Night". It was backed on the B-side by the track "On the South Side of Chicago" and the single was issued by ABC in July 1967.

== Track listing ==
Side one
No.	Title	Writer(s)	Length
1.	"On the South Side of Chicago"	Phil Zeller	2:45
2.	"I Had to Know My Way Around"	A. Hadsle; J. Clifford	3:29
3.	"Mean to Me"	F. Ahlert; R. Turk	2:15
4.	"Something Cool"	Billy Barnes	5:10
5.	"I Heard You Cried Last Night"	T. Grouya; J. Kruger	3:03
6.	"Walking by the River"	R. Sour; U. M. Carlisle	2:52

Side two
No.	Title	Writer(s)	Length
1.	"I Don't Know Enough About You"	Peggy Lee; Dave Barbour	3:15
2.	"A House Is Not a Home"	B. Bacharach; H. David	2:30
3.	"Do I Worry"	B. Worth; S. Cowan	2:42
4.	"The Show Must Go On"	R. Alfred; A. Frisch	3:02
5.	"Some of My Best Friends Are the Blues"	A. Byron; W. Harris	2:55
6.	"I'm Coming Home, Los Angeles"	H. Sanicola; B. Worth	3:32

== Personnel ==
All credits are adapted from the liner notes of Della on Strings of Blue.

- Jimmy Bond, Ray Brown – Bass guitar
- John Collins – Rhythm guitar, string section
- William Duevell – Cover design
- Henry Epstein – Cover design
- Vic Feldman – Vibes
- Joe Lebow – Liner design
- Henry Lewt – Engineer
- Lee Magid – Producer
- Earl Palmer, Ed Thigpen – Drums
- Howard Roberts – Solo guitar
- Fred Seligo – Liner photo
- Kirk Stuart – Piano

== Release history ==
Release history and formats for Della on Strings of Blue
Region	Date	Format	Label	Ref.
Various	September 1967	Vinyl LP (mono); Vinyl LP (stereo)	ABC	
Australia	September 1967	Vinyl LP (mono); Vinyl LP (stereo)	Ampar	
United Kingdom	September 1967	Vinyl LP (mono); Vinyl LP (stereo)	His Master's Voice	
United States	Circa 1984	Vinyl LP	Allegiance	
