= Moody (Della Reese album) =

Studio album by Della Reese
- Released: January 1965
- Studio: RCA Studio A (New York)
- Genre: Pop
- Label: RCA Victor
- Producer: Hugo & Luigi

Della Reese chronology
Waltz with Me, Della (1963)	Moody (1965)	C'mon and Hear Della Reese! (1965)

Moody is a studio album by American singer Della Reese. It was released in January 1965 by RCA Victor, and was the eleventh studio album in her career. The final studio LP Reese recorded for RCA, Moody contained 12 tracks of songs about heartbreak and loss. It received mostly positive reception from critics following its release.

== Background, recording and content ==
Before becoming a television actress (notably on the TV series Touched by an Angel), Della Reese was an established singer and recording artist. She first was signed with Jubilee Records where she had a million-selling single in 1957 with "And That Reminds Me". She then moved to RCA Victor where she had her greatest commercial success in 1959 with "Don't You Know?". She recorded a series of studio albums with RCA between 1959 and 1965, including Moody. It was recorded at RCA Studio A, located in New York City. It was produced by the Hugo & Luigi recording team and featured arrangements by Glenn Osser. Moody consisted of 12 tracks all of which were story lines centered on heartbreak and loss. The album's liner notes argue that while the songs are about despair, Reese's "rocking groove" could change listener's minds.

== Release and critical reception ==
Moody was released by the RCA Victor label in January 1965 and was the eleventh studio album in her music career. It was issued as a vinyl LP, offered in both mono and stereo formats. Six tracks were featured on each side of the LP. Moody would prove to be the final studio LP released by the RCA Victor label before Reese signed with ABC–Paramount Records later in 1965. The album was given mostly positive reviews by critics following its release. Billboard magazine wrote that, "Della tempers each love song with a touch of the blues for added effect and feeling". They further commented that the album felt "warm, romantic and sophisticated". Cue magazine believed Reese had "a voice to spare" but claimed that her performances were too dramatic. Meanwhile, Will Friedwald of the book A Biographical Guide to the Great Jazz and Pop Singers praised it as a set "of exceptionally well-sung slow love songs".

== Track listing ==
Side one
No.	Title	Writer(s)	Length
1.	"The Good Life"	Sacha Distel; Jack Reardon	3:20
2.	"Then You'll Know"	Al Neilburg; Herbert Nelson	3:40
3.	"Don't Worry 'bout Me"	T. Koehler; R. Bloom	2:55
4.	"The End of a Love Affair"	Edward C. Redding	2:35
5.	"Guess I'll Hang My Tears Out to Dry"	Sammy Cahn; Jule Styne	2:45
6.	"All by Myself"	Irving Berlin	4:25

Side two
No.	Title	Writer(s)	Length
1.	"More Than This I Cannot Give"	Hugo & Luigi; George David Weiss	3:22
2.	"My Silent Love"	E. Heyman; D. Suesse	2:55
3.	"I Should Care"	Cahn; Stordahl; Weston	2:55
4.	"Little Girl Blue"	Lorenz Hart; Richard Rodgers	4:50
5.	"Can't We Talk It Over"	Ned Washington; Victor Young	2:55
6.	"Have a Good Time"	Felice and Boudleaux Bryant	3:05

== Personnel ==
All credits are adapted from the liner notes of Moody.

- Michael Dupolix – Liner photo
- Hugo & Luigi – Producer
- Glenn Osser – Arrangement and conducting
- Bob Simpson – Recording engineer

== Release history ==
Release history and formats for Moody
Region	Date	Format	Label	Ref.
Various	January 1965	Vinyl LP (mono); vinyl LP (stereo)	RCA Victor	
Japan	circa 2000	Compact disc	BMG; RCA Records	
Various	circa 2020	Music download; streaming	RCA Records	
