= Della Reese Live =

Live album by Della Reese
- Released: August 1966
- Studio: Western Recorders (Hollywood)
- Genre: Jazz; pop
- Label: ABC–Paramount Records
- Producer: Lee Magid

Della Reese chronology
"i like it like dat!" (1966)	Della Reese Live (1966)	Della on Strings of Blue (1966)

Della Reese Live is a live album by American singer, Della Reese. It was released in August 1966 by ABC–Paramount Records and was the fourth live LP in her career. Although cut at a recording studio, the album was cut in a live format where the ensemble of musicians and Reese gathered together in one room to perform, all completed in one take. The LP was met with favorable reviews and was Reese's final album to make the US Billboard 200 chart.

== Background and recording ==
Before becoming a television actress, Della Reese was an established singer who recorded pop, jazz, blues and gospel. She had her greatest commercial success at RCA Victor when her 1959 single, "Don't You Know?", reached top positions on the US pop and R&B charts. In 1965, she signed a new recording contract with ABC–Paramount Records, the label home of Ray Charles. Reese remained with the label through 1968 and recorded a series of albums. Among them was the live LP, Della Reese Live. Instead of being recorded at a venue, Della Reese Live was cut at Western Recorders, a studio located in Hollywood, California. Reese and her manager/producer, Lee Magid, gathered several jazz musicians together to make the record on a Tuesday evening. According to the liner notes, the concept was to make it sound like it was being performed at a house party. The players gathered together in one room with Reese without doing any second takes. The project featured notable jazz and blues musicians such as Ray Brown, Bill Doggett and Herb Ellis.

== Release, critical reception and chart performance ==
Professional ratings
Review scores
Source	Rating
Allmusic	4.5/5 stars

Della Reese Live was released by the ABC–Paramount label in August 1966 and was the fourth live album in her career. It was distributed as a vinyl LP, offered in both mono and stereo formats. Five selections were featured on each side of the disc. Billboard magazine praised the product, writing, "Both Miss Reese and the combo [the musicians] are in rare form. The live performance gives the album an excitement and immediacy." Cash Box magazine also praised the album, writing, "Here’s a wild session by Della Reese that should make a heap of spinners and buyers, in both the pop and jazz idioms, perk up their ears." Author Waltz Friedwald (writer behind A Biographical Guide to the Great Jazz and Pop Singers) called the album "outstanding" when reviewing her LP's from the period. Della Reese Live rose to the number 149 position on the US Billboard 200 albums chart in October 1966. It was the final album in Reese's career to make the Billboard 200.

== Track listing ==
Side one
No.	Title	Writer(s)	Length
1.	"Gotta Travel On"	Clayton; Lazer; Six; Ehrlich	3:35
2.	"I Got It Bad and That Ain't Good"	P. Webster; D. Ellington	3:45
3.	"Girl Talk"	N. Hefti; B. Troup	3:48
4.	"Ill Wind"	H. Arlen; T. Koehler	2:57
5.	"Driftin' Blues"	J. Moore; E. Williams; C. Brown	6:00

Side two
No.	Title	Writer(s)	Length
1.	"Good Morning Blues"	Basie; Russell; Durham	5:00
2.	"Who Can I Turn To (When Nobody Needs Me)"	A. Newley; L. Bricusse	6:48
3.	"There Will Never Be Another You"	M. Gordon; H. Warren	2:54
4.	"Detour Ahead"	H. Ellis; J. Frigo; L. Carter	3:20
5.	"But Beautiful"	Burke & Van Heusen	4:20

== Personnel ==
All credits are adapted from the liner notes of Della Reese Live.

- Ray Brown – Bass
- Bill Doggett – Organ
- Herb Ellis – Guitar
- Joe Lebow – Liner album design
- Lee Magid – Producer
- Henry Lewy – Engineer
- Shelly Manne – Drums
- Fred Seligo – Photography
- Gerald Wiggins – Piano
- Patricia Willard – Liner notes

== Charts ==
=== Weekly charts ===
Chart (1966)	Peak position
US Billboard 200	149

== Release history ==
Release history and formats for Della Reese Live
Region	Date	Format	Label	Ref.
Various	August 1966	Vinyl LP (mono); vinyl LP (stereo)	ABC–Paramount	
Various	August 1966	Vinyl LP (mono); vinyl LP (stereo)	Ampar	
Various	August 1966	Vinyl LP (mono); vinyl LP (stereo)	His Master's Voice	
Japan	1967	Vinyl LP (stereo)	Impulse!	
Canada	1974	Vinyl LP (stereo)	Birchmount	
Japan	1977	Vinyl LP (stereo)	ABC Records	
