= Emma's Wish =

- Genre: Fantasy; Comedy
- Written by: Cynthia Whitcomb
- Directed by: Mike Robe
- Starring: Joanna Kerns; Della Reese; Harley Jane Kozak; Ashley Edner; William R. Moses
- Music by: Laura Karpman
- Country of origin: United States
- Original language: English

Production
- Executive producer: Paul A. Kaufman
- Producers: Michael O. Gallant; Cynthia Whitcomb
- Cinematography: Edward Pei
- Editor: Sabrina Plisco-Morris
- Running time: 106 minutes
- Production companies: Citadel Entertainment; The Kaufman Company

Original release
- Network: CBS
- Release: October 18, 1998

Emma's Wish is a 1998 American made-for-television fantasy-comedy film directed by Mike Robe. It first aired on CBS on October 18, 1998 and stars Joanna Kerns as an older woman that finds that her wish to be younger has been granted.

== Plot ==
The film begins with a picture-perfect day at the boardwalk for a family of four, mother Emma, father Harry, son Danny and daughter Joy. Young Danny wins a prize at the shooting gallery and selects a 'wish ring' to give to his mother. He says to make a wish since it is her birthday, but she tells him she has everything she wants and will use the wish another day. Fast-forward 35 years later, and Emma is 75 years old and in a nursing home. Her husband is long gone to divorce, her son is dead, and her daughter cannot make it to Emma's birthday party. Joy has a busy life with two young children, a new business, and a husband she is starting to divorce. Emma reluctantly accepts that her family will not be able to join her for her celebration and completes getting dressed up. Being unable to find the necklace she was looking for, she finds the ring her son had given her that long ago day at the carnival. She wears it when she makes a wish and blows out the candles on her cake. In the morning she finds her wish has come true in an unusual way: she had wanted to be able to go to and be with her family to help in their difficult time and she is now 40 years younger, able to go out to them even if they don't come to her. With no time to lose (the wish lasts only for a full month) she buys new clothes and a car, and obtains work at her daughter's house as the new housekeeper/nanny (named Mame). During her time with Joy, Danny and Iris, she learns things about her daughter she didn't know before, makes her peace with her dying ex-husband, and comes to regard her son-in-law Brian as someone who should remain in her daughter and grandchildren's life. She helps more than she thought she could, doesn't accomplish as much as she set out to, and in the end comes to a new understanding with her family that will last to the end of her days.

== Cast ==
- Joanna Kerns - Emma Bridges/Mame
- Della Reese - Mona Washburn, Emma's friend and roommate in the nursing home
- Harley Jane Kozak - (adult) Joy Bridges Bookman
- Ashley Edner - (young) Joy Bridges
- William R. Moses - Brian Bookman
- Courtland Mead - Danny Bookman
- Jeanne Allen - Iris Bookman
- Seymour Cassel - (old) Harry Bridges
- Jon Bruno - (young) Harry Bridges
- Colton James - Danny Bridges
- Stephanie Niznik - Kelly Horner, nursing home director
- Dennis Cockrum - Det. William Steele

== Reception ==
Variety gave Emma's Wish a mixed review, commenting that "If Hallmark Hall of Fame ever decided it had to do a knockoff of "Mrs. Doubtfire," it would look an awful lot like this heartwarming but cloying fantasy telepic.". The Hollywood Reporter panned the film, commenting that while they enjoyed Kern's acting "the story is so simpleminded that it remains a mere trifle".
