= Waltz with Me, Della =

Studio album by Della Reese
- Released: August 1963
- Studio: RCA Victor Studio A (New York)
- Genre: Classical; pop
- Label: RCA Victor
- Producer: Hugo & Luigi

Della Reese chronology
Della Reese at Basin Street East (1962)	Waltz with Me, Della (1963)	Moody (1965)

Waltz with Me, Della is the tenth studio album by American singer Della Reese, released by RCA Victor in August, 1963. The idea for the album was conceived by producers Hugo & Luigi who envisioned Reese singing a variety of cover tunes in a waltz tempo. A total of 12 tracks comprised the collection and it was given positive critical reviews following its release.

== Background ==
Della Reese was later known for an acting career that included starring in the TV series, Touched by an Angel. However, she first found success as a singer of blues, jazz and pop. First recording for Jubilee Records, her 1957 single called "And That Reminds Me" sold over a million copies. It helped her sign with the larger RCA Victor label, where she was paired with production team Hugo & Luigi. The producers recorded a series of albums with Reese and she ultimately had more commercial success. While sitting at a piano in their studio, the Hugo & Luigi pair got an idea to have Reese record an entire album dedicated to the waltz dance style. The pair then found a series of waltz cover tunes for the album.

== Recording and content ==
Waltz with Me, Della was recorded at RCA Studio A located in New York City. Hugo & Luigi were the album's only producers while Glenn Osser provided arrangements. The album consisted of 12 tracks, all of which were covers of songs and were performed in a waltz tempo (all in a three-quarter time). Covers included "Wonderful One", "Always", "The Anniversary Waltz", "What'll I Do", "Falling in Love with Love" and "(I'll Be with You) In Apple Blossom Time".

== Release and critical reception ==
Professional ratings
Review scores
Source	Rating
Allmusic	2/5 stars

Waltz with Me, Della was released by RCA Victor in August 1963 as a vinyl LP, offered in both mono and stereo formats. Six tracks were featured on each side of the disc. It was the tenth studio album in Reese's music career. The album received a mostly positive reception following its release. Billboard found that it "makes for excellent listening" and found that Reese has a "full voiced freshness and originality." Cash Box called it "an ear-captivating package" and further commented that "Della Reese, who can belt a tune with the best of them, turns tender on this new Victor album outing aimed at the waltz. The lark delivers each waltz in caressing fashion guaranteed to delight her many fans." AllMusic did not provide a written review but rated the album two out of five stars.

== Track listing ==
Side one
No.	Title	Writer(s)	Length
1.	"Wonderful One"	Terriss; Grofé; Neilan; Whiteman	2:48
2.	"Tenderly"	Lawrence; Gross	3:30
3.	"Falling in Love with Love"	Rodgers–Hart	2:35
4.	"What'll I Do"	Irving Berlin	2:34
5.	"I Love You"	Thompson; Archer	2:15
6.	"Theme Song from Moulin Rouge (Where Is Your Heart)"	G. Augric; W. Engwick	2:22

Side two
No.	Title	Writer(s)	Length
1.	"Always"	Irving Berlin	3:10
2.	"Fly Me to the Moon (In Other Words)"	Bart Howard	2:48
3.	"I'll Be with You In Apple Blossom Time"	Von Tilzer; Fleeson	2:35
4.	"While We're Young"	Wilder; Palitz; Engwick	3:19
5.	"I'll Always Be in Love with You"	Green; Ruby; Stept	3:09
6.	"The Anniversary Waltz"	Dubin; Franklin	3:03

== Personnel ==
All credits are adapted from the liner notes of Waltz with Me, Della.

- Mickey Crofford – Recording engineer
- Hugo & Luigi – Producer
- M. Ludlow – Illustration
- Glenn Osser – Arrangement and conducting

== Release history ==
Release history and formats for Waltz with Me, Della
Region	Date	Format	Label	Ref.
Various	August 1963	Vinyl LP (mono); Vinyl LP (stereo)	RCA Victor	
Various	circa 2013	Compact disc	Sony Music Entertainment	
Various	circa 2020	Music download; streaming	RCA Records	
