= Della Della Cha-Cha-Cha =

Della, Della, Cha-Cha-Cha

Studio album by Della Reese
- Released: November 1960
- Studio: RCA Victor Studio A (New York)
- Genre: Latin; Cha-Cha-Cha
- Label: RCA Victor
- Producer: Hugo & Luigi

Della Reese chronology
| Della by Starlight (1960) | Della, Della, Cha-Cha-Cha (1960) | Special Delivery (1961) |

Professional ratings
Review scores
| Source | Rating |
|---|---|
| Allmusic | 2/5 stars |

Della, Della, Cha-Cha-Cha is the seventh studio album by American singer Della Reese, released by RCA Victor in November, 1960. The album consisted of 12 tracks performed in the Cha-Cha-Cha sub-genre of Latin music. Most were covers of Broadway show tunes. The album received mixed critical reviews following its release.

== Background ==
Della Reese found success as a singer in the genres of blues, jazz and pop, having her greatest commercial success with the 1959 single, "Don't You Know?". The song was recorded at RCA Victor, a label where she remained for several years and recorded a series of albums. Latin-styled LP's were recorded by several jazz artists during this period and it was theorized by writers Janet Borgerson and Jonathan Schroeder that RCA "cashed in" on the Cha-Cha-Cha Latin sub-genre by having Reese record an entire album of it.

== Recording and content ==
Della Cha-Cha-Cha was recorded at RCA Victor Studio A in New York City under the production of Hugo & Luigi. The album was arranged and conducted by O. B. Masingill. It consisted of 12 tracks with story lines centered on "love and lust" according to writers Janet Borgerson and Jonathan Schroeder. Many of the songs on the project were derived from Broadway theatre, such as "Whatever Lola Wants" (from Damn Yankees) and Cole Porter's "Let's Do It, Let's Fall in Love". Other covers included "Diamonds Are a Girl's Best Friend", "My Heart Belongs to Daddy" and "It's So Nice to Have a Man Around the House".

== Release and critical reception ==
Della Cha-Cha-Cha was released by RCA Victor in November 1960 as a vinyl LP, offered in both mono and stereo formats. Six tracks were featured on each side of the disc. The album received mixed reviews from writers and publications. Both Billboard and Cash Box magazines praised the album, finding that Reese was able to adapt her style easily to the Cha-Cha-Cha sub-genre. Billboard went as far as to called it "A Billboard Pick" in their reviews for the week of November 7, 1960. Meanwhile, Walter Christopherson of The Montreal Gazette found that while some tracks were "quite enjoyable", he found that the repeated Cha-Cha-Cha style became "monotonous" after listening to the entire album. Borgerson and Schroeder of the book Designed for Dancing How Midcentury Records Taught America to Dance found the album to have both "gloriously tacky" arrangements while also finding that it helped Reese blur the "racial lines" of the era. AllMusic did not provide a written review, but rated the album two out of five stars.

== Track listing ==
Adapted from the liner notes of Della Della Cha-Cha-Cha.

| # | Title | Writer(s) | Length |
|---|---|---|---|
| 1. | "Diamonds Are a Girl's Best Friend" | Jule Styne; Leo Robin | 2:52 |
| 2. | "Come On-A My House" | Ross Bagdasarian; William Saroyan | 2:48 |
| 3. | "Why Don't You Do Right?" | Kansas Joe McCoy | 2:45 |
| 4. | "My Heart Belongs to Daddy" | Cole Porter | 2:39 |
| 5. | "Let's Do It (Let's Fall in Love)" | Cole Porter | 2:27 |
| 6. | "Whatever Lola Wants" | Richard Adler; Jerry Ross | 3:12 |
| 7. | "Daddy" | Bobby Troup | 2:39 |
| 8. | "Tea for Two" | Irving Caesar; Vincent Youmans | 2:09 |
| 9. | "Always True to You in My Fashion" | Cole Porter | 3:14 |
| 10. | "It's So Nice to Have a Man Around The House" | John Elliot; Harold Spina | 2:37 |
| 11. | "There's a Small Hotel" | Richard Rodgers; Lorenz Hart | 2:13 |
| 12. | "Love for Sale" | Cole Porter | 2:21 |

== Personnel ==
All credits are adapted from the liner notes of Della Della Cha-Cha-Cha.

- Ernest Oelrich – Recording engineer
- Hugo & Luigi – Producer
- O. B. Masingill – Arrangement and conducting

== Release history ==
Release history and formats for Della Della Cha-Cha-Cha
| Region | Date | Format | Label | Ref. |
|---|---|---|---|---|
| Various | November 1960 | Vinyl LP (mono); vinyl LP (stereo) | RCA Victor | |
| Spain | circa 1998 | Compact disc | RCA; BMG International | |
| Greece | circa 2010 | Compact disc | Music-Box | |
| Various | circa 2020 | Music download; streaming | BMG Music | |
