= C'mon and Hear Della Reese! =

Studio album by Della Reese
- Released: August 1965
- Genre: Pop
- Label: ABC–Paramount Records
- Producer: Bob Thiele

Della Reese chronology
Moody (1965)	C'mon and Hear Della Reese! (1965)	"i like it like dat!" (1966)

Singles from C'mon and Hear Della Reese!
- 1. "After Loving You" Released: June 1965

C'mon and Hear Della Reese! is a studio album by American singer Della Reese. It was released in August 1965 by ABC–Paramount Records and was her debut album released with the label. It was a collection of 12 songs, featuring both new recordings and covers of standards. One single was included on the LP: "After Loving You". The single reached positions on both the US Hot 100 and the adult contemporary charts. The LP received mostly a positive response by music publications.

== Background, recording and content ==
Prior to her success as an actress (including the TV series Touched by an Angel), Della Reese was primarily known as a singer and a recording artist. She had her greatest commercial success while with the RCA Victor label, which issued a series of studio and live albums. Many singles were also released, including the number two US song, "Don't You Know?" (issued in 1959). In 1965, Reese was signed by Larry Newton to ABC–Paramount, the label-home of Ray Charles. For her debut label, Reese was paired with producer Bob Thiele and arranger Peter DeAngelis. It would be the only release from the label featuring both men. C'mon and Hear Della Reese! was a collection of 12 tracks, consisting of new recordings and covers of standards. Cover tunes included "It's Magic", "A Hundred Years from Today" and "My Devotion". Original tracks included Reese's single "After Loving You".

== Release, critical reception and singles ==
C'mon and Hear Della Reese! was released by the ABC–Paramount label in August 1965 and was distributed as a vinyl LP (offered in either mono or stereo editions). Six songs were featured on either side of the disc. It was mostly given a positive reception by music publications. Billboard magazine found that Reese "made a tremendous impact" with her label debut album, noting that her delivery had hints of gospel music within it. Record World also gave the album a positive reception finding that "she mixes the new the old and gets a pleasant blend of attractive chanting." However, Will Friedwald (author of the book A Biographical Guide to the Great Jazz and Pop Singers) gave it a less favorable response when describing Reese's discography. Friedwald criticized the album's production, finding it to be "well-chosen" material but "sabotaged by overdone strings-and-choir charts by Peter DeAngelis." The album's only single was "After Loving You", which was first issued by ABC–Paramount in June 1965. The song reached number 95 on the US Hot 100 and number 21 on the US adult contemporary chart in 1965.

== Track listing ==
Side one
No.	Title	Writer(s)	Length
1.	"After Loving You"	Eddie Miller	2:37
2.	"Home (When Shadows Fall)"	P. Van Steeden; Harry & Jeff Clarkson	3:07
3.	"My Devotion"	Roc Hillman; Johnny Hapton	2:29
4.	"It's Magic"	S. Cahn; S. Styne	2:22
5.	"A Wilted Flower"	Ben Blossner; Irma Hollander	2:50
6.	"A Hundred Years from Today"	J. Young; N. Washington; V. Young	3:26

Side two
No.	Title	Writer(s)	Length
1.	"Her Little Heart Went to Loveland (And His Little Heart Stayed Home)"	Buddy Kaye; Philip Springer	2:52
2.	"I Only Want a Buddy Not a Sweetheart"	Edward H. Jones	2:17
3.	"I Need You So"	Ivory Joe Hunter	2:55
4.	"A Lover's Prayer"	Jan Smith	2:17
5.	"Blues for the Weepers"	M. Rich; L. Magid	3:31
6.	"How Do You Keep from Cryin'"	Peter DeAngelis; Jean Sawyer	2:45

== Personnel ==
All credits are adapted from the liner notes of C'mon and Hear Della Reese!.

- ARW Productions – Cover photo and design
- Peter DeAngelis – Arranger and conductor
- Frank Hunter – Arranger (Side A: Tracks 3 and 4)
- Joe Lebow – Liner design
- Bob Thiele – Producer
- Rick Ward – Liner notes

== Release history ==
Release history and formats for C'mon and Hear Della Reese!
Region	Date	Format	Label	Ref.
Various	August 1965	Vinyl LP (mono); vinyl LP (stereo)	ABC–Paramount	
United Kingdom	August 1965	Vinyl LP (mono); vinyl LP (stereo)	His Master's Voice	
Australia	August 1965	Vinyl LP (stereo)	Universal Record Club	
Taiwan	1969	Vinyl LP (stereo)	中聲	
Belgium	1972	Vinyl LP	Probe	
Various	1978	Vinyl LP; cassette	Pickwick	
Various	1994	Compact disc	Discovery	
