= After Loving You =

1962 Eddy Arnold song

"After Loving You" is a song written by American songwriter Eddie Miller. It was originally recorded and released as a single by Eddy Arnold in 1962. His version was a top ten single on the US country songs chart that year. It was then recorded and released as a single by Della Reese in 1965. Her version was a top 40 US adult contemporary song the same year. In 1969, Elvis Presley recorded the track for an album.

== Eddy Arnold and Della Reese versions ==
"After Loving You"

Single by Eddy Arnold

from the album Sometimes I'm Happy, Sometimes I'm Blue
- B-side: "How You Keep from Cryin'"
- Released: June 1962
- Genre: Country
- Length: 2:06
- Label: RCA Victor
- Songwriter: Eddie Miller
- Producer: Chet Atkins

Eddy Arnold singles chronology
"Tears Broke Out on Me" (1962)	"After Loving You" (1962)	"Does He Mean That Much to You" (1962)

"After Loving You"

Single by Della Reese

from the album C'mon and Hear Della Reese!
- B-side: "How You Keep from Cryin'"
- Released: July 1965
- Genre: Pop
- Length: 2:37
- Label: ABC–Paramount Records
- Songwriter: Eddie Miller
- Producer: Bob Thiele

Della Reese singles chronology
"If I Didn't Care" (1964)	"After Loving You" (1965)	"And That Reminds Me" (1965)

Eddie Miller had gained success composing songs, including writing "Don't Let the Rain Come Down" for The Serendipity Singers. Among the tunes he composed was a song called "After Loving You", which was first recorded by Eddy Arnold was produced by Chet Atkins. It was released as a single by the RCA Victor label in June 1962. It served as the B-side to "A Little Heartache". The B-side was a top ten single on the US Hot Country Songs chart, rising to number seven in 1962. It also reached the US Bubbling Under Hot 100 chart, peaking at number 12. It later was released on Arnold's 1964 studio album titled Sometimes I'm Happy, Sometimes I'm Blue. The song was then recorded by American singer Della Reese and released as the A-side to a single in June 1965 by ABC–Paramount Records. Reese's version rose to number 95 on the US Hot 100 and number 21 on the US adult contemporary chart in 1965. It appeared on her 1965 studio album C'mon and Hear Della Reese!.

=== Charts ===
==== Eddy Arnold version ====
Chart (1962)	Peak position
US Bubbling Under Hot 100 (Billboard)	12
US Hot Country Songs (Billboard)	7

==== Della Reese version ====
Chart (1965)	Peak position
US Adult Contemporary (Billboard)	21
US Billboard Hot 100 (Billboard)	95

== Elvis Presley version ==
"After Loving You"

Song by Elvis Presley

from the album From Elvis in Memphis
- Released: June 17, 1969
- Recorded: February 18, 1969
- Studio: American Sound Studio
- Length: 3:05
- Label: RCA Victor
- Songwriters: Eddie Miller, (Johnny Lantz)
- Producers: Chips Moman, Felton Jarvis

Elvis Presley notably recorded "After Loving You" in American Sound Studio in Memphis on February 18, 1969. The version in castellan or was performed by Marco T, winning Colombian performer Elvis tribute festival in 1995. The song was originally meant to be recorded several months prior but was ultimately chosen when Presley decided to cut some of his favorite cover tunes.
