= Della by Starlight =

Studio album by Della Reese
- Released: May 1960
- Studio: RCA Studio B (New York)
- Label: RCA Victor
- Producer: Hugo & Luigi

Della Reese chronology
Della (1960)	Della by Starlight (1960)	Della Della Cha-Cha-Cha (1960)

Della by Starlight is the sixth studio album by singer Della Reese, released by RCA Victor in May, 1960. The LP was a collection of 12 ballads that were considered by the liner notes to be "love songs". The album received positive reviews.

== Background, recording and content ==
Della Reese was both a singer and actress. She began her career as a singer recording a mixture of blues, jazz, and pop. Her first contract with Jubilee Records resulted in the 1957 commercially successful single "And That Reminds Me". Reese then signed a contract with RCA Victor, where she had her greatest commercial period. Reese was paired with production team Hugo & Luigi at the RCA label, which resulted in a series of studio albums. Among them was 1960's Della by Starlight. The album was a collection of 12 tracks that were categorized as "love songs" according to the liner notes. The love songs on the album helped give it the title Della by Starlight. It also featured string instrumentation conducted by Glenn Osser. Many of the album's songs were ballads, such as "He Was Too Good to Me", "Lamplight", "Two Sleepy People", and "These Foolish Things".

== Release and critical reception ==
Della by Starlight was released in May 1960 on the RCA Victor label and was her sixth studio album (her second with the RCA company). It was distributed as a vinyl LP, featuring six songs on each side of the disc. It received positive reviews from music publications and critics. Billboard believed the album had "very strong sales potential", finding that Reese created her own musical style on each of the album's songs. Cash Box magazine further commented, "In a program of romantic ballads Miss Reese performs with the artistic poise and intensity of voice that has become the most distinctive features of her popularity." Although no formal review was provided, the website AllMusic rated Della by Starlight three out of five stars.

== Track listing ==
Side one
No.	Title	Writer(s)	Length
1.	"The Touch of Your Lips"	Ray Noble	3:15
2.	"He Was Too Good to Me"	Rodgers; Hart	3:18
3.	"That Old Feeling"	Brown; Fain	3:27
4.	"I Had the Craziest Dream"	Gordon; Warren	3:50
5.	"I Wish I Knew"	Gordon; Warren	3:20
6.	"Lamplight"	Shelton	3:35

Side two
No.	Title	Writer(s)	Length
1.	"How Did He Look?"	Silver; Shelley	4:15
2.	"More Than You Know"	Rose; Eliscu; Youmans	4:25
3.	"These Foolish Things"	Marvell; Stratchey; Link	4:20
4.	"Deep in a Dream"	DeLange; Van Heusen	3:40
5.	"Embraceable You"	G. & I. Gershwin	3:45
6.	"Two Sleepy People"	Loesser; Carmichael	3:35

== Personnel ==
All credits are adapted from the liner notes of Della by Starlight.

- Ted Coconis – Painting
- Ernest Oelrich – Recording engineer
- Ray Hall – Recording engineer
- Hugo & Luigi – Producer
- Glenn Osser – Arrangement and conducting

== Release history ==
Release history and formats for Della by Starlight
Region	Date	Format	Label	Ref.
Various	May 1960	Vinyl LP (mono); vinyl LP (stereo)	RCA Victor	
Various	1982	Vinyl LP (stereo)	RCA International	
Various	Circa 2010	Music download; streaming	Harrison James Music	
