= Amen! =

Studio album by Della Reese and Meditation Singers
- Released: November 1958
- Genre: Religious; sacred
- Label: Jubilee
- Producer: Morty Palitz

Della Reese chronology
Melancholy Baby (1956)	Amen! (1958)	The Story of the Blues (1959)

Professional ratings
Review scores
Source	Rating
Allmusic	4/5 stars

Amen! is a studio album by American singer Della Reese and the Meditation Singers. It was released in November 1958 by Jubilee Records and was her second studio album. The disc was a nine-track collection of sacred songs, which stemmed from Reese's background in the gospel field. Amen! received positive reviews from music publications following its release.

== Background and recording ==
Della Reese was later known for her work as an actress (notably in the television series Touched by an Angel) but began her career as a singer. She found success recording blues, jazz and pop, but started her career as a gospel performer. She sang in church from an early age, which led to her joining The Meditation Singers quartet based out of Detroit, Michigan. The album was recorded in Detroit and featured production (and arrangements) by Morty Palitz. The Meditation Singers joined Reese for the creation of the album. The group's lineup credited in the album were: Ernestine Rundless, Laura Lee and DeLillian Price.

== Content ==
Amen! was a collection of nine tracks. The album's title track served as the opening song and was backed by a choir. The second song, "Jesus Will Answer Your Prayer", was an up-tempo gospel tune. The third track, "Last Mile of the Way", was a recitation that featured only a piano backing Reese's vocal. "Rock a My Soul" was also an uptempo recording. The album also includes a cover of Sister Rosetta Tharpe's "Up Above My Head I Hear Music in the Air".

== Release and critical reception ==
Amen! was released by Jubilee Records in November 1958 and was Reese's second studio album. It was distributed as a vinyl LP with four songs on "Side 1" and five songs on "Side 2". Cash Box magazine wrote, "Miss Reese’s sturdy delivery skillfully makes the rhythmic and dramatic most of the material. Important sacred issue." Saturday Review magazine called it "a new side of a great artist". Furthermore, the publication wrote: "Della Reese sings a joyous group of deeply moving spiritual and gospel songs." Lindsay Planer of AllMusic gave the album four out of five stars, writing, "The incomparable style and grace of Della Reese (vocals) shines through every second of Amen! (1958). The effort would be her third overall and first full-length platter dedicated to honoring her considerable background as a sacred singer."

== Track listing ==
1. “Amen!” (Adapted by Palitz) – 3:56
2. “Jesus Will Answer Your Prayer” (Barret, Lillenas) – 2:46
3. “Last Mile of the Way” (Adapted by Palitz) – 4:06
4. “Nobody Knows the Trouble I've Seen” (Adapted by Palitz) – 4:41
5. “Rock-a-My Soul” (Adapted by Palitz) – 2:04
6. “Hard to Get Along” (Rundles) – 5:20
7. “Up Above My Head I Hear Music in the Air” (Tharpe) – 3:08
8. “I Know the Lord Has Laid His Hands on Me” (Adapted by Palitz) – 3:39
9. “Jesus” (Coleman) 2:21

== Release history ==
Release history and formats for Amen!
Region	Date	Format	Label	Ref.
North America	November 1958	Vinyl LP (mono); vinyl LP (stereo)	Jubilee Records	
Germany	November 1958	Vinyl LP (mono)	London Recordings	
United Kingdom	November 1958	Vinyl LP (mono)	London Recordings	
North America	circa 2020	Music download; streaming	Parlophone Records	
