= Della (album) =

Studio album by Della Reese
- Released: January 1960
- Recorded: October 1959
- Studio: RCA Victor, New York City
- Genre: Swing; pop
- Label: RCA Victor
- Producer: Hugo & Luigi

Della Reese chronology
| What Do You Know About Love? (1959) | Della (1960) | Della by Starlight (1960) |

Singles from Della
- 1. "Someday (You'll Want Me to Want You)" Released: January 1960

Della is a studio album by American singer Della Reese accompanied by a big band led by Neal Hefti. Released in January 1960, the album was Reese's first for RCA Victor following her departure from Jubilee Records in 1959. The album, produced by Hugo & Luigi, was one of her most successful and was nominated for a Grammy Award in 1961. All of the recordings were covers of standards including "Someday (You'll Want Me to Want You)", which made the US Hot 100 in 1960. It was Reese's first album to make the US albums chart and received mostly positive reviews. Reese came up with some of her own vocal arrangements, and these were expanded by Hefti, who added new twists of his own.

== Background ==
Della Reese began her career singing the musical genres of blues, jazz and pop. Her first recordings were made for the Jubilee label and she had commercial success with 1957's "And That Reminds Me". She then signed a new contract with RCA Victor and had her greatest commercial success with the song "Don't You Know?". For her first RCA Victor album, Reese was paired with production team Hugo & Luigi who wanted to capture her "swinging" musical style on the album.

== Recording and content ==
Della was recorded at RCA Victor studios in New York City during three weeks in October 1959, with Reese backed by a big band conducted and arranged by Neal Hefti. Prior to the full band sessions, Reese was asked to record and rehearse the songs in front of her producers Luigi Creatore and Hugo Peretti, with George Butcher accompanying Reese on piano. (Butcher was a veteran of Duke Ellington's orchestra.) During the rehearsal, Reese decided against singing "I Guess I'll Have to Change My Plan" because the male-perspective lyric was too difficult to change into a female perspective. For the song "And the Angels Sing", Reese created her own arrangement by opening with a vocalese rendition of Charlie Parker's "Bird of Paradise" saxophone solo, then by injecting bits of melody from "I Hear Music".

Reese's additions were later incorporated by Hefti into the big band arrangement, such that the band quoted portions of "I Hear Music", and even more of "Bird of Paradise" than just the solo. Hefti's big band arrangement of "You're Driving Me Crazy" used a figure from Count Basie's recent recording of "Moten Swing". Reese received no credit for her arrangement contributions. The resulting album was a collection of 12 covers of pop standards. Among them was "The Lady Is a Tramp" (associated with Frank Sinatra) for which Reese improvised new lines, putting her own mark on the song. Other standards on the project were "Thou Swell" and "Blue Skies".

== Release and critical reception ==
Professional ratings
Review scores
| Source | Rating |
|---|---|
| Allmusic | 3/5 stars |

Della was originally released in January 1960 by the RCA Victor label. It was distributed as a vinyl LP, with six tracks on each side. It was offered in both mono and stereo formats. It was reissued by BMG in 2002, totaling 22 tracks on two discs. The second disc contained the rehearsal sessions of all of the songs performed by Reese backed by Butcher. Reese can be heard speaking to her producers about the songs.

The album received mostly positive reviews following its original release. The Afro-American found the album "read like an all-time hit parade and in them is an illustration of warmth in which the artist sings". The Montreal Gazette criticized Reese, writing, "I find her voice much too affected and her manner too forced and artificial, although she does have a good voice." Billboard gave it a four-star rating and wrote, "Miss Reese is both lusty and soft and sweet in this well-paced grouping of tunes". Will Friedwald, in his book A Biographical Guide to the Great Jazz and Pop Singers, named it "one of the hardest swinging" of Reese's albums for RCA Victor. Alex Henderson of the website AllMusic gave it three out of five stars, finding that Reese "brings high pop standards" to the collection even if she could not be categorized as a jazz music artist.

== Chart performance and singles ==
Della was Reese's first album to make the US Billboard 200 chart, rising to the number 35 position in 1960. It was also her only album to reach the top 40 on the chart and her highest-charting release there. It was one of four albums of hers to make the Billboard 200 through 1966. One single was spawned from the collection: Reese's cover of "Someday (You'll Want Me to Want You)". It was first issued by RCA Victor as a seven-inch single in January 1960 and was backed on the B-side by "The Lady Is a Tramp". It rose to the number 56 position on the US Billboard Hot 100 singles chart that year, becoming Reese's fifth song to make the chart.

== Track listing ==
Side one
| No. | Title | Writer(s) | Length |
|---|---|---|---|
| 1. | "The Lady Is a Tramp" | Hart; Rodgers | 2:35 |
| 2. | "If I Could Be with You (One Hour Tonight)" | Creamer; Johnson | 2:46 |
| 3. | "Let's Get Away from It All" | Dennis; Adair | 2:25 |
| 4. | "Thou Swell" | Hart; Rodgers | 2:22 |
| 5. | "You're Driving Me Crazy" | Walter Donaldson | 2:25 |
| 6. | "Goody Goody" | Malneck; Mercer | 3:30 |

Side two
| No. | Title | Writer(s) | Length |
|---|---|---|---|
| 1. | "And the Angels Sing" | Mercer; Elman | 2:38 |
| 2. | "Baby, Won't You Please Come Home" | Warfield; Williams | 3:05 |
| 3. | "I'm Beginning to See the Light" | James; Ellington; Hodges; George | 2:22 |
| 4. | "I'll Get By" | Ahlet; Turk | 2:33 |
| 5. | "Blue Skies" | Irving Berlin | 1:45 |
| 6. | "Someday (You'll Want Me to Want You)" | Jimmy Hodges | 5:10 |

== Personnel ==
All credits are adapted from the liner notes of Della.

- Ray Hall – Recording engineer
- Neal Hefti – Arranger, conductor
- Hugo & Luigi – Producer
- George Butcher – Piano (rehearsal sessions)

== Charts ==
=== Weekly charts ===
| Chart (1960) | Peak position |
|---|---|
| US Billboard 200 | 35 |

== Release history ==
Release history and formats for Della
| Region | Date | Format | Label | Ref. |
|---|---|---|---|---|
| Various | January 1960 | Vinyl LP (mono); vinyl LP (stereo) | RCA Victor | |
| Australia | 1969 | Vinyl LP mono | RCA Camden | |
| Japan | 1977 | Vinyl LP stereo | RCA Records | |
| Various | April 23, 2002 | Compact disc | Bluebird Records; BMG; RCA Records | |
| Various | circa 2020 | Music download; streaming | RCA Sony Entertainment | |
