= "i like it like dat!" =

Studio album by Della Reese
- Released: February 1966
- Genres: Blues; pop
- Label: ABC–Paramount Records
- Producer: Lee Magid

Della Reese chronology
C'mon and Hear Della Reese! (1965)	"i like it like dat!" (1966)	Della Reese Live (1966)

Singles from "i like it like dat!"
- 1. "Tain't Nobody's Bizness If I Do" Released: February 1966; 2. "If It's the Last Thing I Do" Released: June 1966

"i like it like dat!" is a studio album by American singer Della Reese. It was released in February 1966 by the ABC–Paramount Records label and was her second LP issued with the company. It was a collection of 12 songs performed in a blues style and featured several cover tunes. The album received a mixed reception from critics, some of which praised the production while others did not. Two singles were also included on the product.

== Background, recording and content ==
Notably remembered for her acting career, Della Reese first gained international recognition as a singer of various musical styles. She was most successful while at the RCA Victor label, recording the number two US Hot 100 single, "Don't You Know?" (issued in 1959). She also recorded a series of studio and live albums with the label. She was then signed by Larry Newton to the ABC–Paramount label in 1965 and they issued her first album called C'mon and Hear Della Reese! (1965). The album was produced by Bob Thiele but he was replaced on "i like it like dat!" by Reese's manager, Lee Magid. Magid then brought in Bobby Bryant to provide the arrangements and conduct the album. Both received credit on the liner notes for "i like it like dat!". The album consisted of 12 tracks in total, many of which were cover tunes of blues standards, such as Billy Eckstine's "Fool That I Am" and two songs by Johnny Mercer: "Travelin' Light" and "Drinkin' Again".

== Release, critical reception and singles ==
"i like it like dat!" was released by ABC–Paramount in February 1966 and was her second album with the label. It was distributed as a vinyl LP, offered in either mono or stereo formats. Six tracks were on each side of the disc. The album received a mixed critical reception. Billboard magazine praised the product, writing, "The dynamic songstress displays her great gospel style in this exciting package of both raunchy hod funky blues ballads." Also praising the LP, Cash Box magazine wrote, "With Bryant and a rhythm section backing the lark, this set could be a strong candidate for chart honors."

Meanwhile, Will Friedwald (author of the book A Biographical Guide to the Great Jazz and Pop Singers) criticized it, finding it to be "an occasionally overly jukeboxy attempt to bring out Reese's blues strengths, evoking Dinah Washington and Aretha Franklin." He did praise the ballads on the album as being "outstanding". Although no written review was provided, AllMusic gave the album a two out of five star rating. Two singles were issued from the album as well: "'Tain't Nobody's Bizness If I Do" and "If It's the Last Thing I Do".

== Track listing ==
Side one
No.	Title	Writer(s)	Length
1.	"Travelin' Light"	J. Mercer	2:35
2.	"If It's the Last Thing I Do"	D. Washington	2:55
3.	"Tain't Nobody's Bizness If I Do"	P. Grainger; E. Robbins	2:04
4.	"Every Evenin' Blues"	D. Reese	2:22
5.	"A Stranger on Earth"	R. Ward; S. Feller	2:50
6.	"I Ain't Ready for That"	D. Reese	2:05

Side two
No.	Title	Writer(s)	Length
1.	"Fool That I Am"	F. Hunt	3:19
2.	"If I Never Get to Heaven"	D. Washington	2:25
3.	"Drinkin' Again"	J. Mercer; D. Tauber	2:32
4.	"Man with a Horn"	B. Lake; J. Jenney; E. DeLange	3:04
5.	"In the Dark"	L. Green	2:30
6.	"Nobody Knows the Way I Feel This Morning"	P. & T. Delaney	2:45

== Personnel ==
All credits are adapted from the liner notes of "i like it like dat!".

- Bobby Bryant – Arranger and conductor
- Lee Magid – Producer

== Release history ==
Release history and formats for "i like it like dat!"
Region	Date	Format	Label	Ref.
Various	February 1966	Vinyl LP (mono); Vinyl LP (stereo)	ABC–Paramount	
Various	February 1966	Vinyl LP (mono); Vinyl LP (stereo)	His Master's Voice; Ampar	
Various	Circa 1984	Vinyl LP (mono); Vinyl LP (stereo)	Jasmine	
