= What Do You Know About Love? =

Studio album by Della Reese
- Released: December 1959
- Studio: Brussels
- Genre: Traditional pop
- Label: Jubilee
- Producer: Morty Palitz

Della Reese chronology
The Story of the Blues (1959)	What Do You Know About Love? (1959)	Della (1960)

Singles from What Do You Know About Love?
- 1. "I'm Nobody's Baby" Released: August 1959

Professional ratings
Review scores
Source	Rating
Allmusic	4/5 stars

What Do You Know About Love? is a studio album by American singer Della Reese. It was released in December 1959 by Jubilee Records. The songs on the album focused on stories about love and mixed two new tracks with ten standards conducted by Reg Owen. The song "I'm Nobody's Baby" was released as a single.

== Background, recording and content ==
Della Reese found success as both a television actress and as a singer. She began her career singing in the fields of gospel, blues and pop. Her first recording contract was with Jubilee Records and she remained there through 1959. During this period, Reese had commercial success with the single "And That Reminds Me". Among her studio recordings from Jubilee was 1959's What Do You Know About Love?. The album was recorded in Brussels, Belgium while Reese was performing overseas. The album had orchestra arrangements conducted by British orchestra leader Reg Owen and production from Morty Palitz. What Do You Know About Love? consisted of 12 tracks. The album's title and the story lines of its songs were all centered on love. Ten of its tracks were covers of standards while two were new recordings. Among its covers were Duke Ellington's "I Got It Bad".

== Release, critical reception and singles ==
What Do You Know About Love? was originally released in December 1959 on the Jubilee label. It was distributed as a vinyl LP, with six tracks on each side of the disc, offered in both mono and stereo formats. The album was Reese's final with Jubilee before she transitioned to RCA Victor. Billboard found the album had "moving vocal performances" while Cash Box found that it "presents Miss Reese in a program of superior love ballads." AllMusic's Lindsay Planer gave the album four out of five stars, praising Reese's readings of material, but also found that some tracks lacked some of the individuality found inside many of other her recordings. The album included one single release: "I'm Nobody's Baby". It was issued by Jubilee in August 1959.

== Track listing ==
Side one
No.	Title	Writer(s)	Length
1.	"What Do You Know About Love?"	M. Goode; W. Scarf	3:11
2.	"When I Fall in Love"	A. Selden	3:10
3.	"Something I Dreamed Last Night"	J. Yellen; H. Magidson; S. Fain	3:35
4.	"I Got It Bad"	P. Webster; Duke Ellington	3:17
5.	"I'll Never Be the Same"	G. Kahn; Malneck; F. Signorelli	2:10
6.	""You Better Go Now""	B. Reichner; R. Graham	2:43

Side two
No.	Title	Writer(s)	Length
1.	"I'm Nobody's Baby"	B. Davis; M. Ager; L. Santly	3:08
2.	"I Never Knew"	T. Pitts; R. Egan; R. K. Marsh	3:05
3.	"I Thought of You Last Night"	R. Freed	2:09
4.	"You Don't Know What Love Is"	R. Raye; DePaul	2:39
5.	"I'm Thru with Love"	G. Kahn; M. Malneck; F. Livingston	3:17
6.	"That's All There Is"	G. Jenkins	2:20

== Release history ==
Release history and formats for What Do You Know About Love?
Region	Date	Format	Label	Ref.
North America	December 1959	Vinyl LP (mono); vinyl LP (stereo)	Jubilee Records	
Australia	1961	Vinyl LP (mono)	Festival Records	
Japan	January 2017	Compact disc	Jubilee Records	
North America	circa 2020	Music download; streaming	Parlophone Records	
