= Della Reese at Basin Street East =

Della Reese At Basin Street East

Live album by Della Reese
- Released: 1964
- Recorded: 1964
- Genre: Traditional pop, jazz, R&B
- Length: 31:57
- Label: RCA Victor
- Producer: Hugo & Luigi

Della Reese chronology
The Classic Della (1962)	Della Reese At Basin Street East (1964)	Waltz with Me, Della (1963)

Della Reese At Basin Street East is a live album by Della Reese that was recorded and released in 1964.

The album was conducted by John Cotter. It was reissued by RCA/BMG in 2004 on compact disc alongside the 1962 album Della on Stage.

== Track listing ==
=== Side one ===
1. "Put on a Happy Face/ I Want to Be Happy" (2:14)
2. "The Best Thing for You" (2:42)
3. "I Wanna Be Around" (1:57)
4. "Don't Tell Me Your Troubles" (1:55)
5. "I'll Take Care of Your Cares" (4:20)
6. "Nobody's Sweetheart" (4:21)

=== Side two ===
1. "'S Wonderful" (1:37)
2. "Anything Goes" (2:08)
3. "Don't Take Your Love from Me" (4:22)
4. "Chicago" (2:52)
5. "And Now" (2:15)
6. "You Came a Long Way from St. Louis" (3:14)

== Release history ==
Release history and formats for Della Reese at Basin Street East
Region	Date	Format	Label	Ref.
North America	1964	Vinyl LP	RCA Victor	
