= Not One Minute More =

Single by Della Reese
- B-side: "You're My Love"
- Released: November 12, 1959
- Recorded: 1959
- Genre: Pop
- Length: 2:35
- Label: RCA Victor
- Songwriters: Don Robertson; Hal Blair; Lou Dinning
- Producer: Hugo & Luigi

Della Reese singles chronology
"Don't You Know?" (1959)	"Not One Minute More" (1959)	"Someday (You'll Want Me to Want You)" (1960)

"Not One Minute More" is a 1959 song and single by American singer and actress Della Reese.

The song became her third big hit and million-seller, and peaked at number #16 on the Billboard Hot 100 chart, and #12 on the US Billboard R&B chart. Reese continued recording albums, but her singing career took a backseat to her acting and television appearances.

"Not One Minute More" was originally written for Elvis Presley by songwriters Don Robertson and Hal Blair. The song was also recorded in 1959 by pianist Earl Grant. This version is used as closing song in the Black Mirror episode, "Striking Vipers".
