= Psychic Killer =

1975 film by Ray Danton

- Theatrical release poster
- Directed by: Ray Danton
- Written by: Greydon Clark; Mikel Angel; Ray Danton
- Produced by: Mohammed Rustam
- Starring: Paul Burke; Jim Hutton; Julie Adams; Nehemiah Persoff; Neville Brand; Aldo Ray
- Cinematography: Herb Pearl
- Edited by: Michael Brown
- Music by: William Kraft
- Production companies: Lexington Productions; Syn-Frank Enterprises
- Distributed by: AVCO Embassy Pictures
- Release date: November 7, 1975 (Atlanta)
- Running time: 89 minutes
- Country: United States
- Language: English

Psychic Killer is a 1975 American supernatural horror film directed by Ray Danton and written by Greydon Clark, Mikel Angel and Ray Danton. The film stars Paul Burke, Jim Hutton, Julie Adams, Nehemiah Persoff, Neville Brand and Aldo Ray. The film was released in December 1975, by AVCO Embassy Pictures. Originally released under the alternate title The Kirlian Force, it was changed to Psychic Killer to emphasize the more sensational horror scenes of the film.

This was the final theatrical film for both Jim Hutton and Paul Burke.

== Plot ==
Arnold Masters is a young man serving time in an institution for the criminally insane for a crime he did not commit.

Arnold reveals his situation to a fellow inmate: His mother was very sick, and needed an operation to remove a tumor. But due to Arnold's mother having no insurance, the doctor did not perform the operation. When Arnold returned to the doctor's office, the doctor was found dead, and Arnold was framed for the crime. A speedy trial resulted in Arnold's testimony being used against him, and as a result, he was found not guilty of murder by reason of insanity. And during his time in the institution, his mother had died, which Arnold did not know about until six months later.

An inmate gives Arnold an amulet, in which Arnold learns astral projection - the art of leaving one's physical body and transporting the soul elsewhere. Arnold is soon freed from the institution after the doctor's real killer was caught and confessed to the crime. Soon after, Arnold begins using his newfound power of astral projection to kill those he feels were responsible for his incarceration and his mother's death.

Among Arnold's victims are a court appointed psychiatrist whose testimony at Arnold's trial sealed his fate; the nurse who was supposed to care for Arnold's mother, but neglected to do so; the police officer who arrested Arnold; and the lawyer who sold out Arnold at the trial. All their deaths are made to look like accidents, which baffles the police - most notably, Lt. Jeff Morgan.

Lt. Morgan pieces together the connection of the victims to Arnold, and visits Arnold's house one night. Morgan is determined to get to the bottom of all these deaths, even though he has no evidence linking Arnold to the murders. Morgan is soon joined by Arnold's doctor, Laura Scott, who tried to help Arnold during his time in the institution, and a colleague of hers, Dr. Gubner.

Before long, Morgan decides to put an end to Arnold's murderous spree. Morgan recalls a conversation where Arnold can be medically dead while in his trance. While Arnold is having another out-of-body experience, Morgan goes over to his house and has the medical examiner take Arnold's physical body to the Chapel of the Pines Crematory, following the formality of the medical examiner signing his death certificate. While Morgan is having Arnold's body loaded into an oven at the crematorium, Arnold's astral form sees Laura in his house. Just as Arnold is talking to Laura, he suddenly lets out a horrible scream. Arnold's astral form realizes that his physical body is being burned alive in the crematorium oven. Arnold wakes up in the oven, screaming in agony until he is burned to death.

== Cast ==
- Paul Burke as Police Lt. Jeff Morgan
- Jim Hutton as Arnold James Masters
- Julie Adams as Dr. Laura Scott
- Nehemiah Persoff as Dr. Gubner
- Neville Brand as Lemonowski
- Aldo Ray as Lt. Dave Anderson
- Whit Bissell as Dr. Paul Taylor
- Rod Cameron as Dr. Commanger
- Della Reese as Mrs. Gibson
- Mary Charlotte Wilcox as Nurse Burnson
- Judith Brown as Anne Turner
- Joseph Della Sorte as Harvey B. Sanders
- Greydon Clark as Police Sgt. Marv Sowash
- Harry Holcombe as Judge
- Robin Raymond as Jury Foreman
- Jerry James as Dr. Cummings
- Diane Deininger as Arnold's Mother
- John Dennis as Frank
- Bill Quinn as Hospital Coroner
- Marland Proctor as Motorcycle Cop
- Walter O. Miles as Coroner
- Stack Pierce as Emilio
- Mello Alexandria as Cop
- Sandra Rustam as Young Girl

== Release ==
Psychic Killer opened regionally in the United States, having its world premiere in Atlanta, Georgia on November 7, 1975.
