= The Story of the Blues =

Studio album by Della Reese
- Released: 1959
- Genre: Blues; jazz
- Label: Jubilee
- Producer: Morty Paltiz

Della Reese chronology
Amen! (1958)	The Story of the Blues (1959)	What Do You Know About Love? (1959)

Professional ratings
Review scores
Source	Rating
AllMusic	3/5 stars

The Story of the Blues is a studio album by American singer Della Reese. It was released by Jubilee Records in 1959 and was the third studio album in her career. The album contained 11 tracks that told the story of blues music in chronological order and featured mostly blues standards (with the exception of two new songs). It was given a positive response by authors and music publications.

== Background, recording and content ==
Although eventually transitioning into acting, Della Reese began her career as a singer. She signed with Jubilee Records in 1954 and recorded a variety of material in the genres of jazz, pop and blues. The latter would be the musical style of Reese's third studio project. The Story of the Blues was based on stories told by the arranger Sy Oliver, who worked with blues performer Bessie Smith. Along with Reese's input, Oliver envisioned the album to chronologically tell the story of the genre through blues songs and spoken word narration. The album also featured production by Morty Palitz. The Story of the Blues comprised 11 tracks. The project featured mostly covers of blues standards such as "Squeeze Me" and "Stormy Weather". Only two original recordings were part of the project: the title track and "There's Always the Blues".

== Release and critical reception ==
The Story of the Blues was released in 1959 by Jubilee Records and was the third studio album in Reese's career. It was distributed as a vinyl LP offered in both mono and stereo formats. Six songs were included on "side 1" while five songs were included on "side 2". Author Will Friedwald found the album to be "the most ambitious of Reese's early projects" and theorized that its use of spoken word foreshadowed her career as an actress. American Record Guide found it to be "one of the greatest albums ever produced .... telescoping 100 years of musical history into minutes, milestoning from the start of the blues to now." The album received three out of five stars from AllMusic but did not have a written review.

== Track listing ==
Side one
No.	Title	Writer(s)	Length
1.	"The Story of the Blues"	Bushkin; Burke	1:27
2.	"Good Morning Blues"	Basie; Durham; Rushing	2:50
3.	"Empty Bed Blues"	J. C. Johnson	2:50
4.	"Squeeze Me"	Waller; Williams	2:33
5.	"You've Been a Good Old Wagon"	John Henry	2:45
6.	"Sent for You Yesterday (And Here You Come Today)"	Basie; Durham; Rushing	2:28

Side two
No.	Title	Writer(s)	Length
1.	"St. James Infirmary"	Joe Primrose	3:59
2.	"Lover Man"	Davis; Sherman; Ramirez	3:05
3.	"Things Ain't What They Used to Be"	Ellington	2:28
4.	"Stormy Weather"	Arlen; Koehler	3:29
5.	"There's Always the Blues"	Bushkin; Burke	2:45

== Release history ==
Release history and formats for The Story of the Blues
Region	Date	Format	Label	Ref.
North America	1959	Vinyl LP mono; Vinyl LP stereo	Jubilee Records	
United Kingdom	1959	Vinyl LP mono; Vinyl LP stereo	London Recordings	
Japan	1972	Vinyl LP stereo	Jubilee Records	
Japan	2016	Compact disc	Jubilee Records	
North America	circa 2020	Music download; streaming	Parlophone Records	
