= Melancholy Baby (album) =

Studio album by Della Reese
- Released: 1956
- Genre: Blues; jazz
- Label: Jubilee

Della Reese chronology
| Melancholy Baby (1956) | Amen! (1958) |

Singles from Melancholy Baby
- 1. "My Melancholy Baby" Released: 1956

Melancholy Baby is a studio album by American singer Della Reese. It was released in 1956 by Jubilee Records and was the debut studio release in Reese's career. The album was a collection of standards performed by Reese in a blues style. The album received a positive response from music publications such as Billboard and Cashbox magazines. It spawned one single which happened to be the collection's title track.

== Background, recording and content ==
Della Reese was later known as an actress (notably on the series Touched by an Angel) but she began her career as a singer who recorded blues, jazz and pop. She first signed a recording contract in 1954 with Jubilee Records. The label would issue her first LP Melancholy Baby. The album was a collection of 12 tracks that were described by Billboard as "standards" such as "When Your Lover Has Gone" and "Say It Isn't So". According to the liner notes, Reese performed the tracks in a Blues style.

== Release, critical reception and singles ==
Melancholy Baby was first released to operators in 1956 and received a positive response upon its initial release according to Cash Box. It was released by Jubilee Records and was offered as a vinyl LP in mono format with six tracks on each side of the disc. It received a positive response from music publications following its release. Billboard magazine found the album to showcase Reese's "dramatic, stylized thrushing". Cashbox similarly wrote, "Her bursts of energy, her clever elongated phrasing, and a convincing wistful delivery are spread over 12 sturdy pieces." Although no formal review was given, AllMusic rated the album three out of five stars. The album's title track was the only single spawned from the collection.

== Track listing ==
Side one
| No. | Title | Writer(s) | Length |
|---|---|---|---|
| 1. | "My Melancholy Baby" | George Norton; Ernie Burnett |
| 2. | "Who Can I Turn To?" | Alec Wilder |
| 3. | "Mood Indigo" | Albany Bigard; Duke Ellington; Irving Mills |
| 4. | "I Get Along Without You Very Well" | Hoagy Carmichael |
| 5. | "Cottage for Sale" | Larry Conley; Wilford Robinson |
| 6. | "They Can't Take That Away from Me" | George Gershwin; Ira Gershwin |

Side two
| No. | Title | Writer(s) | Length |
|---|---|---|---|
| 1. | "One for My Baby" | Harold Arlen; Johnny Mercer |
| 2. | "I Could Have Told You So" | Jimmy Van Heusen; Carl Sigman |
| 3. | "When Your Lover Has Gone" | E. A. Swan |
| 4. | "Say It Isn't So" | Irving Berlin |
| 5. | "All Alone" | Irving Berlin |
| 6. | "It's Monday Every Day" | Sidney Robin |

== Personnel ==
All credits are adapted from the liner notes of Melancholy Baby.

- Sid Bass – Arrangements
- Mort Goode – Liner notes
- Urbie Green, Frank Saracco, Lew McGarrity – Trombone
- Al Hall, Milt Hinton – Bass guitar
- Osie Johnson – Drums
- Sy Leichman – Photography
- Lecihman-Seide Association – Cover
- Billy Mure – Guitar
- Jimmy Nottingham, Charlie Shavers, Rex Solomon – Trumpet
- Carl Prager – Alto saxophone
- Margaret Ross – Harp
- Billy Taylor – Piano

== Release history ==
| Region | Date | Format | Label | Ref. |
|---|---|---|---|---|
| North America | 1956 | LP Mono | Jubilee Records | |
| Japan | 2016 | Compact disc | Jubilee Records (Jazz Masters Collection) | |
| North America | circa 2020 | Music download; streaming | Parlophone Records | |
