= Quando me'n vo' =

Aria from La Bohème by Giacomo Puccini

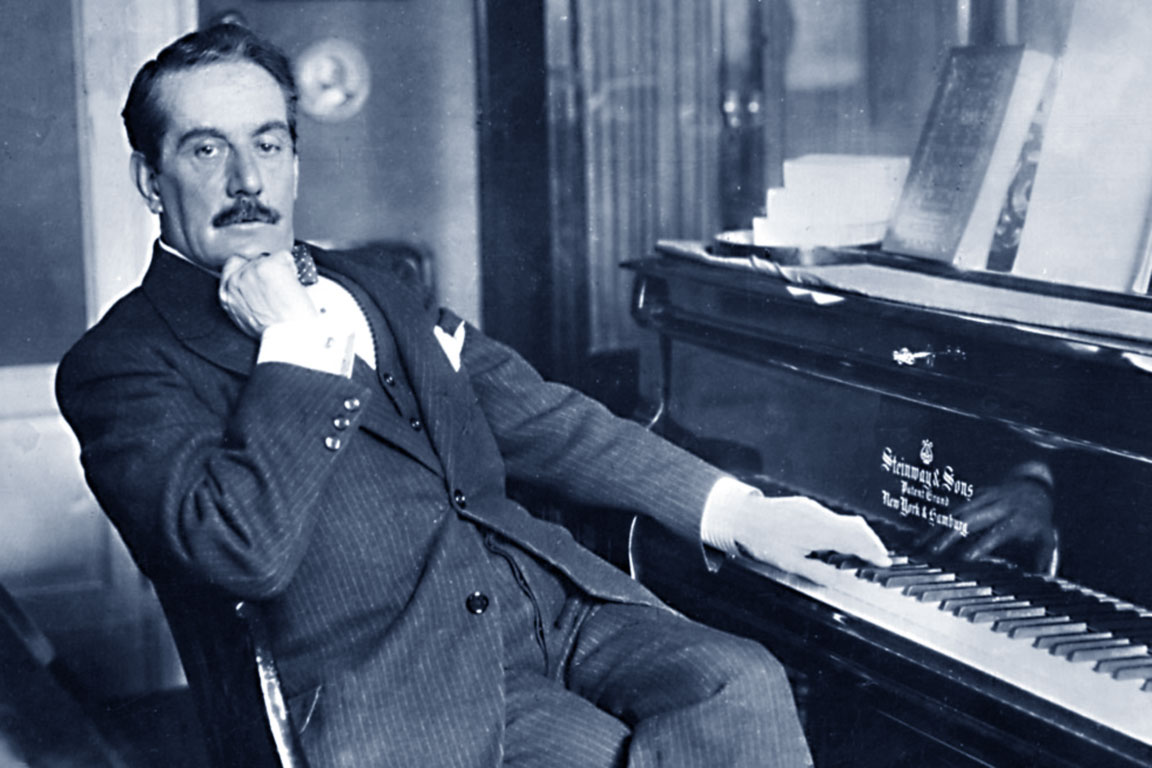
Giacomo Puccini in 1900

"Quando m'en vo'", also known as "Musetta's Waltz", is a soprano aria, a waltz in act two of Puccini's 1896 opera La bohème. It is sung by Musetta, in the presence of her bohemian friends, hoping to reclaim the attention of her occasional boyfriend Marcello.

This scene takes place at the Café Momus. Shortly after Mimì, Rodolfo, and their friends have taken seats for a drink, Marcello's former girlfriend, Musetta, shows up with her current patron, the elderly Alcindoro. They quarrel for a bit, then the episode begins as Musetta initiates her move on Marcello. She grabs the spotlight, musically speaking, for a short self-promoting aria (Quando m'en vo'). It is a song directed at the people in the café as much as at the audience in the theater.

== Libretto ==
Quando m'en vo'
Quando m'en vo' soletta per la via,
la gente sosta e mira
e la bellezza mia tutta ricerca in me
da capo a piè ...

Ed assaporo allor la bramosia
sottil, che da gli occhi traspira
e dai palesi vezzi intender sa
alle occulte beltà.
Così l'effluvio del desìo tutta m'aggira,
felice mi fa!

E tu che sai, che memori e ti struggi
da me tanto rifuggi?
So ben:
Le angoscie tue non le vuoi dir,
ma ti senti morir!

When I walk
When I walk all alone in the street,
people stop and stare at me
and look for my whole beauty
from head to feet ...

And then I taste the slight yearning
which transpires from their eyes
and which is able to perceive from manifest charms
to most hidden beauties.
So the scent of desire is all around me,
it makes me happy!

And you, while knowing, reminding and longing,
you shrink from me?
I know it very well:
you don't want to express your anguish,
but you feel as if you're dying!

== Later uses ==
Popular renditions of the melody were produced during the 1950s, including an American Top 40 hit by Sammy Kaye ("You") and a version by Della Reese ("Don't You Know?"), which reached number two on the U.S. Billboard Hot 100.

In addition, an arrangement of the song by pianist Dick Hyman and saxophonist Moe Koffman was used in the soundtrack to the film Moonstruck.

In the Broadway musical Rent, which is inspired by La Bohème, the first verse of the song "Take Me or Leave Me" has lyrics based on those of "Quando m'en vo'". Also, the character Roger plays the melody of "Quando m'en vo" on his guitar several times, prompting his friend Mark to sarcastically say, "That doesn't remind us of Musetta's Waltz."
