= Della Reese =

American singer and actress (1931–2017)

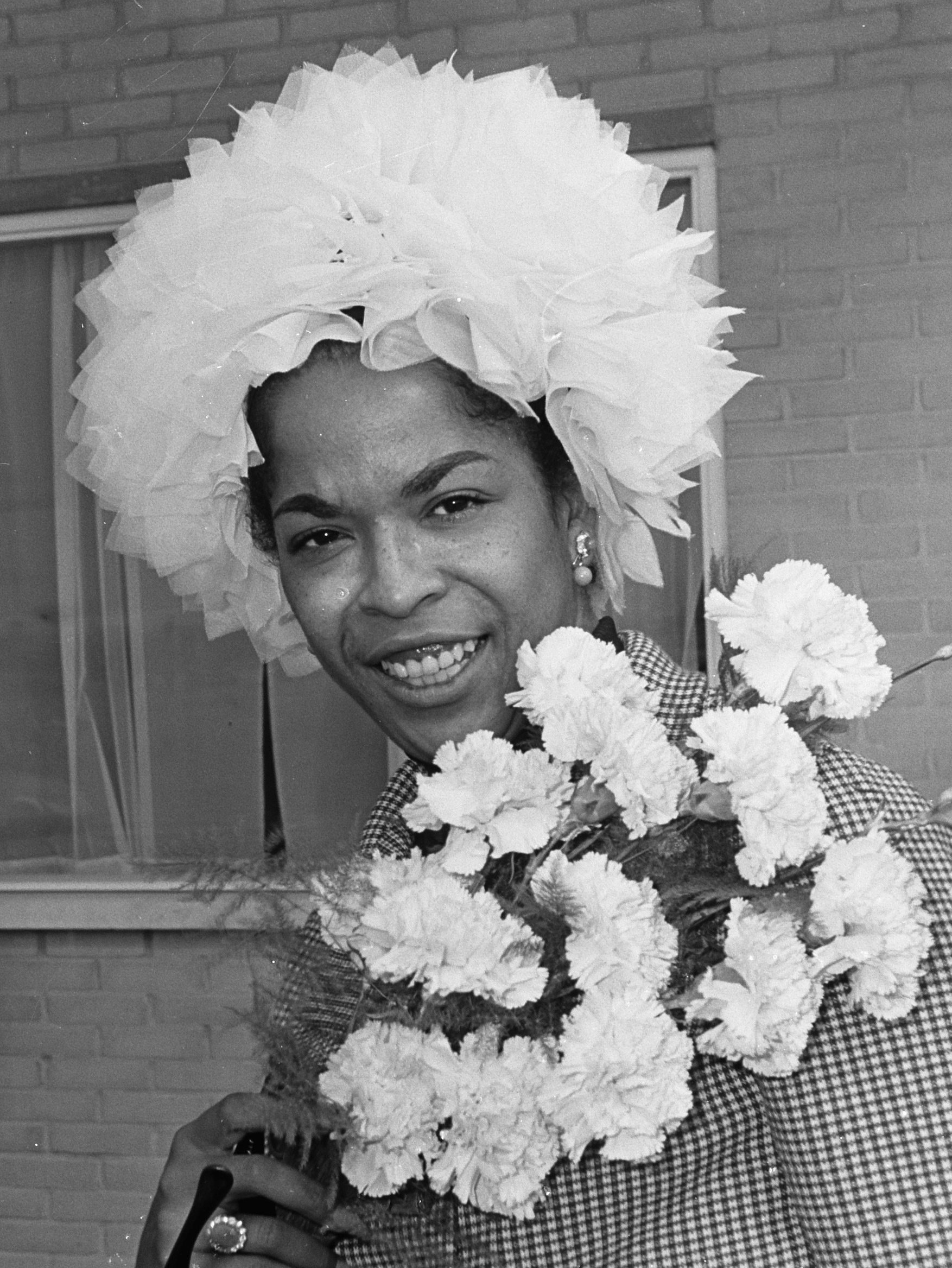
- Reese in 1965
- Born: Delloreese Patricia Early; July 6, 1931; Detroit, Michigan, U.S.
- Died: November 19, 2017 (aged 86); Los Angeles, California, U.S.
- Education: Wayne State University (attended)
- Occupations: Singer; actress; television personality; author; minister
- Years active: 1953–2014
- Works: Discography; filmography
- Spouses: Vermont Taliaferro (m. 1952; div. 1958); Leroy Basil Gray (m. 1959; ann. 1961); Mercer Ellington (m. 1961; ann. 1961); Franklin Lett Jr. (m. 1983)
- Children: 4
- Musical career
- Genres: Blues; pop; jazz; gospel
- Instrument: Vocals
- Labels: Great Lakes; Jubilee; RCA; ABC–Paramount; Avco Embassy; LMI; Jazz a la Carte; Applause; Atlanta International; Lett; Homeland; Spiritual Icon

Della Reese (born Delloreese Patricia Early; July 6, 1931 – November 19, 2017) was an American singer, actress, television personality, author and ordained minister. As a singer, she recorded blues, gospel, jazz and pop. Several of her singles made the US Hot 100, including the number two charting song, "Don't You Know?" (1959). As a television personality and actress, she was the first black woman to host her own talk show and starred on the highly-rated CBS television series Touched by an Angel.

Born and raised in Detroit, Michigan, Reese sang in her church's choir and was discovered by gospel entertainer, Mahalia Jackson, who took Reese on tour for several years. Reese then joined a gospel group called The Meditation Singers before turning her attention towards secular music. She won a local talent competition, which led to a multiple-week appearance at The Flame nightclub in New York City. The appearance helped Reese secure her first recording contract with Jubilee Records in 1954 where she recorded a series of albums. Her only commercial success at the label was the 1957 single, "And That Reminds Me", which sold a million copies. Signing a contract with the larger RCA Victor label, she had her greatest success as a singer with the songs "Don't You Know" and "Not One Minute More". Several more LP's were issued by RCA Victor including the top 40-charting album, Della (1960).

Reese began appearing on nationally-broadcast US television programs by the early 1960s, notably The Ed Sullivan Show and The Tonight Show Starring Johnny Carson. Her appearances led to the creation of her own talk show called Della, which ran for nearly 200 episodes between 1969 and 1970. She continued recording through the 1970s with albums issued by ABC–Paramount, Avco Embassy and LMI. During the 1970s, Reese started an acting career in films such as Psychic Killer and shows such as Chico and the Man. She returned to gospel music after forming the group, Brilliance, which released an album in 1985 and was later nominated by the Grammy Awards. Reese then appeared in Eddie Murphy's 1989 film Harlem Nights and the short-lived 1991 TV series co-starring Redd Foxx called The Royal Family.

Reese became an ordained minister during the 1980s decade and began regularly leading sermons. Reese then went on to star, in the lead role of Tess, in the CBS TV series, Touched by an Angel, co-starring Roma Downey. Airing in 1994, the show became one of the top-rated and highest-watched shows for the CBS network for several years and Reese remained on the show until 2003. During the 1990s, Reese continued recording as well, releasing the Grammy-nominated gospel album, My Soul Feels Better Right Now (1998). She also released her autobiography in 1997 titled, Angels Along the Way. Four more books followed by Reese through 2012. She also starred in several CBS television films during the 2000s and appeared in the 2005 film Beauty Shop. Reese continued acting until her retirement in 2014.

== Early years ==
Della Reese was born Delloreese Patricia Early on July 6, 1931, in the Black Bottom neighborhood of Detroit, Michigan to Richard Thaddeus Early (a steelworker) and Nellie Mitchelle (a cook). Her mother was alleged to have Cherokee ancestry. She also had five older sisters and one brother. From a young age, Reese and her mother would attend cinemas to watch popular films of the era. She often returned from the films acting out scenes at home. Reese also enjoyed singing from an early age, often singing at a high volume into the skylight of their home's bathroom. According to Reese, her singing became so loud that her parents boarded up the skylight so she could not sing anymore.

Reese joined her local church choir at age six. At age 13, she was heard by gospel performer, Mahalia Jackson, who was impressed by her singing and chose her to replace another female vocalist in her road show. Reese toured with Jackson throughout the United States for three summers during her adolescent years. In her late teenage years, Reese joined a Detroit-based gospel group called the Meditation Singers. During this time she also attended Detroit's Cass Technical High School where she graduated at age 15, and then majored in psychology at Wayne State University in 1949.

Reese ultimately dropped out of college after her mother died of a cerebral hemorrhage. She then had a falling-out with her father, which caused her to move out of the family home and support herself by working odd jobs. This included working as a truck driver and taxi cab driver. At the same time, she continued touring and performing with the Meditation Singers. However, Reese left the group after becoming increasingly frustrated by the lack of money she was earning as a gospel performer. It was during this period that she changed her professional name to Della Reese.

She then turned her attention towards secular music, eventually finding employment at Detroit's Oriel Bowling Alley, one of the first bowling alleys in the region to offer live entertainment. While working there, she entered a local talent show and won the program. As first-place-winner, Reese was given the opportunity to perform a one-week engagement at The Flame, a New York City nightclub known for elevating aspiring black performers. The one-week stint turned into an 18-week engagement that was heard by agent, Lee Magid. With Magid's help, Reese joined the Erskine Hawkins orchestra in 1953.

== Music career ==
=== 1954–1958: Early recordings and commercial success ===
The first recordings Reese made were issued on the Great Lakes label, resulting in one 1954 single release: "Yes Indeed". Magid then helped Reese sign her first official recording contract with an independent label named Jubilee Records. Her debut-label single was 1955's "In the Still of the Night", which sold 500,000 copies according to biographer Jessie Carney Smith. Additional mid-1950s releases included a cover of "Time After Time", "Years from Now" and "My Melancholy Baby". The latter served as the title tune to Reese's 1956 debut Jubilee LP of the same name. Reese then recorded "And That Reminds Me", an English adaptation of the Italian "Autumn Concerto" instrumental. It was her first charting single, reaching number 12 on the US Billboard Hot 100, number 15 in Australia and number five in Canada. It was also Reese's first song to sell over one million copies.

Reese's music career was further elevated by Ed Sullivan who featured her on his television show multiple times and exposed her to a national audience. She remained with the Jubilee label through 1959, recording a total of 15 singles and six albums. Her second studio LP was 1958's Amen! a collection of gospel songs that included The Meditation Singers and was cut in her hometown. The label also issued her first live album titled A Date with Della Reese at Mr. Kelly's in Chicago (1958). It was followed by a collection of blues standards titled The Story of the Blues (1959), which consisted of both songs and spoken word narration by Reese describing genre's history. A studio album of ballads was then released in 1959 titled What Do You Know About Love? along with a compilation of her Jubilee singles, which was also called And That Reminds Me. Music publications of the era praised Reese's distinctive vocal enunciation and "emotional" delivery on her LP's.

=== 1959–1970: "Don't You Know?" and peak commercial years ===
Reese was signed in August 1959 to a long-term recording contract with the RCA Victor label and was paired with production team, Hugo & Luigi. Her first RCA release was the 1959 single "Don't You Know?", which was adapted from "Musetta's Waltz" in La bohème. "Don't You Know?" became Reese's most commercially-successful single, reaching number two on the US Hot 100 and number one on the US R&B sides chart. Selling over one million copies, it became Reese's second disc to receive a gold certification. Her second RCA single, "Not One Minute More" (1960), rose to number 16 on the US Hot 100, number 12 on the US R&B chart and number 14 in Australia. Both singles led to the release of her first RCA studio LP titled Della (1960), which featured cover tunes performed in both swing and pop styles. It featured arrangements made first by Reese then augmented by Neal Hefti but only Hefti was credited as arranger. Della also became her first LP to make the US Billboard 200 chart, peaking at number 35.

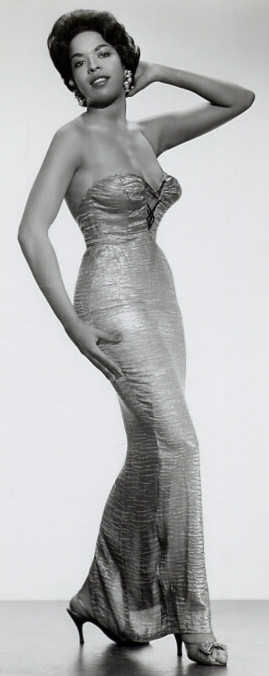
Reese, c. 1961

Reese reached her peak commercial success during this period leading to a variety of opportunities, including singing "The Star Spangled Banner" at the 1960 Major League Baseball All-Star Game. The performance made Reese the first black music artist to perform at an All-Star game. RCA Victor continued issuing studio albums by Reese during the early 1960s, including another swing-inspired LP titled Special Delivery, which rose to number 113 on the Billboard 200 in 1961. The latter featured arrangements made by Mercer Ellington (the son of Duke Ellington), whom Reese briefly married. Her 1962 studio LP, The Classic Della, was her third to make the Billboard 200, rising to number 94. Consisting of vocal adaptations of classical pieces, it also included "Don't You Know?". It was then followed by a similarly-themed LP titled Waltz with Me, Della (1963). The label also issued Reese's second and third live LP's: Della on Stage (1962) and Della Reese at Basin Street East (1964). Both albums featured a variety of songs ranging from blues to gospel. RCA also continued issuing singles by Reese, none of which made the top 40 of the US charts. Her highest-peaking single of this period was her cover of "Someday (You'll Want Me to Want You)", which made the Hot 100 top 60 in 1960.

In 1965, Reese signed a new recording contract with ABC–Paramount, which strove to market her further in a pop direction. Her first label single was 1965's "After Loving You", which rose to number 95 on the US Hot 100 and number 21 on the US adult contemporary chart. Reese's only other single to chart was a 1966 cover of "It Was a Very Good Year", which peaked at number 99 on the Hot 100. The label also issued several studio LP's that featured of variety of musical genres including pop, jazz and the blues: C'mon and Hear Della Reese! (1965), "i like it like dat!" (1966), Della on Strings of Blue (1967) and I Gotta Be Me...This Trip Out (1968).

During this period, Reese routinely toured nightclubs and theaters across the US. She also became a mainstay performer in Las Vegas, but often faced racial discrimination working there as a black entertainer. "I could sing there but I could not eat there," she recalled in 2004. Nonetheless, Reese worked the Las Vegas strip for nine years. She also continued her recording career, signing a new contract in 1969 with Avco Embassy Records, a label that was presided over by Reese's former RCA producers, Hugo & Luigi. Her first Avco Embassy single was a cover of "Games People Play" (backed on the B-side with a cover of "Compared to What"). Both songs were Reese's final to make the US charts, both reaching the Bubbling Under Hot 100 in 1970. They appeared on her first-label studio LP titled Black Is Beautiful, which was her only one to make the US R&B albums chart. The label issued a second studio album in 1970 titled Right Now.

=== 1971–2006: Later recordings and return to gospel music ===
Reese's commercial success waned during the 1970s and she spent more time focused on an acting and television career. However, she continued performing clubs and toured regularly. She also continued a recording career, becoming one of the first artists to join Lee Magid's LMI Records in 1973. The label issued a single by Reese titled "(If Loving You Is Wrong) I Don't Want to Be Right". The label then issued Reese's next studio album the same year titled Let Me in Your Life, which Magid produced himself. Reese then collaborated with the Jazz a La Carte Players for the 1979 live album, One of a Kind. The album was considered a return to her jazz roots, according to Stereo Review.

Reese joined Applause Records in 1982 and the label issued her next studio album called Sure Like Lovin' You. A one-time "jam session" with several musicians led Reese to return to gospel music and form a group called Brilliance. The group included O.C. Smith, Mary Clayton, Vermettya Royster, and Eric Strom. They signed a contract with Atlanta International Records and an album was issued in 1986 titled Della Reese and Brilliance. Co-produced by Reese herself, it was praised as "an absolutely stunning album" by Billboard in 1987 and a song from the collection ("You Gave Me Love") received a nomination by the Grammy Awards for Best Female Gospel Soul Performance. Reese continued recording into the 1990s, appearing with a live album on her husband's Lett label titled Some of My Best Friends Are the Blues in 1995. A second live album was issued in 1998 by Homeland called My Soul Feels Better Right Now. It was Reese's third recording to receive a nomination by the Grammy Awards. Her final album project was a 2006 studio collection issued by the Spiritual Icon label titled Give It to God.

=== Artistry ===
Reese's music has been classified into the genres of blues, jazz, gospel, pop and R&B. Will Friedwald of the book A Biographical Guide to the Great Jazz and Pop Singers classified Reese as a jazz artist whose repertoire had elements of swing as well. Meanwhile, AllMusic critic Lindsay Planer claimed she "was never a hardcore jazz singer" because she was not "improvisation minded" like that of Carmen McRae or Sarah Vaughan. Planer instead claimed that Reese's musical style was centered more in pop, similar in style to that of Tony Bennett or Jo Stafford. Author James Lynwood Walker called Reese an "outstanding contemporary blues singer", categorizing her with Lou Rawls and Al Hibbler. Reese cited Ethel Waters as her earliest musical influence and then cited Mahalia Jackson as an influence in her teen years. "She taught me how to communicate with people—to sing so that people would appreciate it and get a feeling from it," Reese told Parade in 2014. Reese also cited Sarah Vaughan, Ella Fitzgerald and Carmen McRae as influences on her singing as well.

== Television and acting career ==
=== 1959–1974: National television stardom and Della ===
Reese's television career was launched by Ed Sullivan, who regularly featured her on his nationally-syndicated program, The Ed Sullivan Show. During tapings, Reese routinely performed "And That Reminds Me" because it was a personal favorite of Sullivan and his wife. In the late 1960s, Reese focused more on television appearances as her nightclubs began to close and the music industry changed. According to Reese, she was the first black music artist to "sit down" on televised talk show. She first appeared on The Merv Griffin Show, which further elevated offers to appear on more major television programs. She then became friendly with Mike Douglas, who invited her to co-host his television show.

Reese was then approached by director Woody Fraser about hosting her own talk show on network television. According to Reese, Fraser was "a kidder" and she did not take his offer seriously until he came to her home three weeks later with a set designer. The Della talk show was launched in 1969, making Reese the first black woman to have her own talk show on prime time television. The show ran for nearly 200 episodes through March 1970 and aired on national television five days a week. During the show's run, Reese performed songs herself and had guest performers on episodes. It was ultimately cancelled due to the cost of having a 16-piece orchestra. Reese was offered to cut the orchestra but she ultimately refused and decided to cancel it instead. She then ran into Johnny Carson in a television studio hallway and he invited her to guest-host his show. Reese agreed and in 1970, she became the first African-American woman to guest-host The Tonight Show Starring Johnny Carson.

=== 1975–1993: Acting transition ===
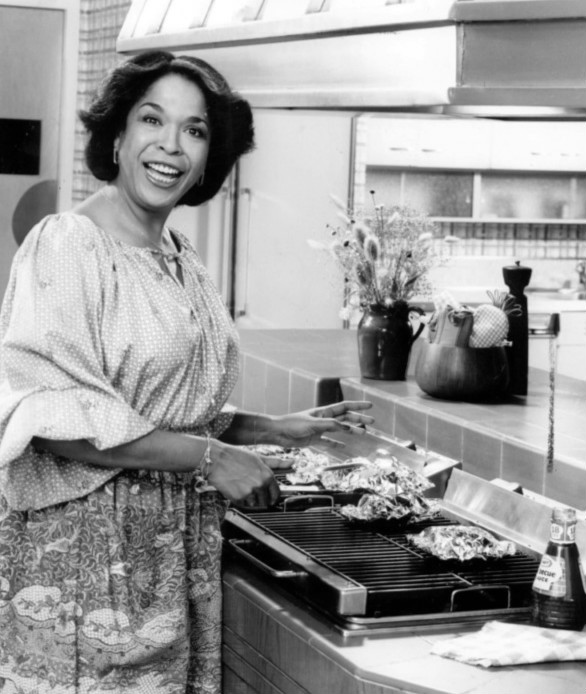
Reese appearing in a Kraft Foods commercial, 1977

In addition to television roles, Reese also embarked on an acting career. "It was just like one thing flowing into another. It was finding another rhythm so you could take the music out," she recalled in an interview. Although her first speaking role was in The Mod Squad (1969), it took several years for Reese to gain acceptance as an actress rather than as a singer. In 1975, Reese played the role of Mrs. Gibson in the thriller movie, Psychic Killer. She then had a recurring role in the television series Chico and the Man where she portrayed the owner of a lunch wagon and catering business. She remained on the show through 1978 when it was cancelled following the death of Freddie Prinze. Reese also appeared in theatrical productions during this period, including Ain't Misbehavin (1982) and Blues in the Night (1983).

Eddie Murphy did not have Reese in mind when he was looking for a female actress to play a madame in his upcoming movie. However, after auditioning, Murphy was "shocked" by her acting abilities, according to an article from Jet. In 1989, Harlem Nights was released featuring Murphy and Reese, along with Richard Pryor, Jasmine Guy, Arsenio Hall and Redd Foxx. The film was unsuccessful at the box office and was given negative reviews by film critics. Yet, the comedic chemistry between Foxx and Reese on Harlem Nights inspired Murphy to write The Royal Family, a TV show which aired on CBS in September 1991. One month later, Foxx suffered a heart attack during a filming of an episode. Reese thought Foxx was "doing pratfalls" and did not take it seriously until she saw him lying on the floor in pain. Foxx died the same day and the show attempted to return but it did not produce the same ratings as it did with Foxx there, leading to its cancellation in 1992.

=== 1994–2014: Success with Touched by an Angel and final acting credits ===
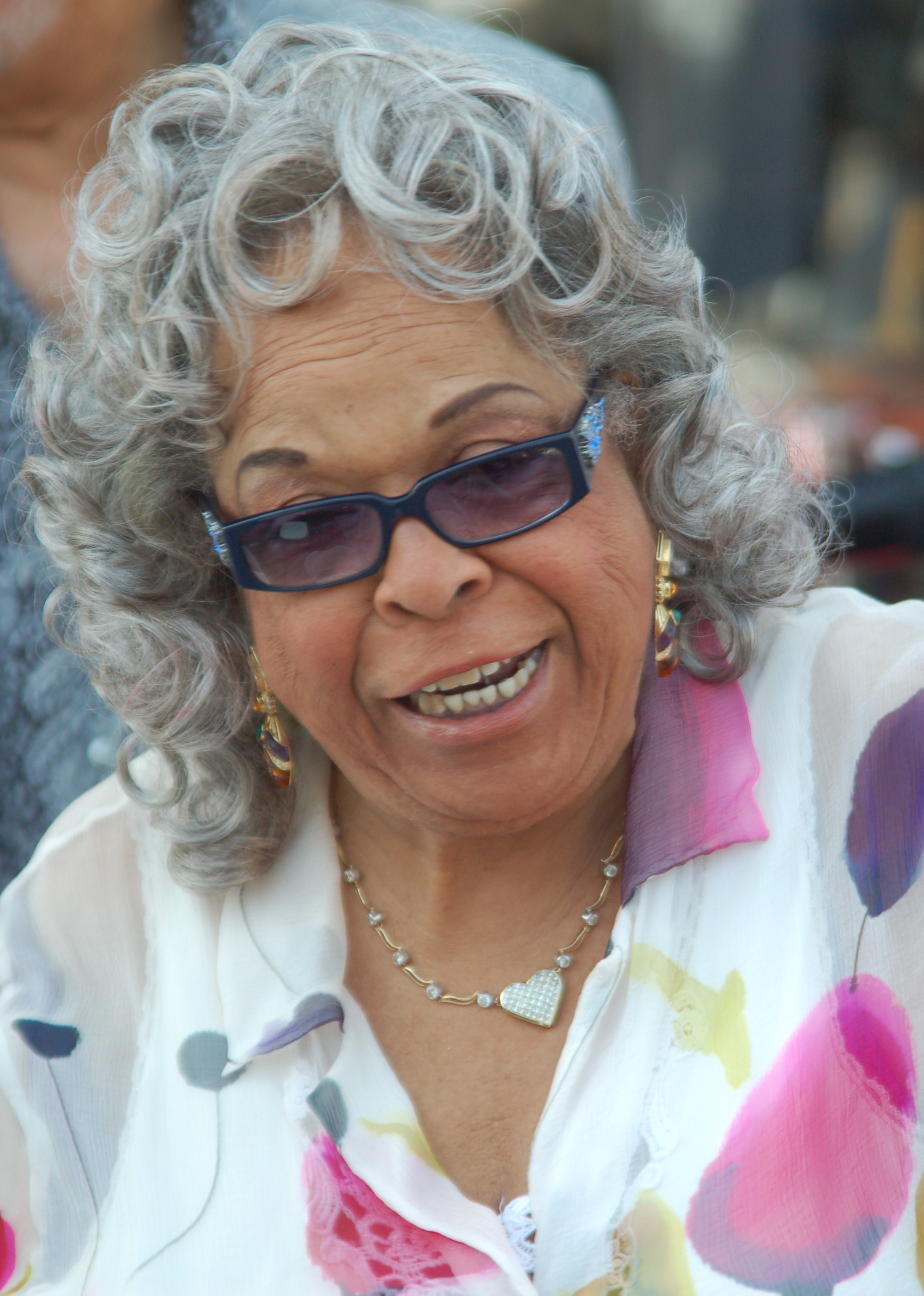
Reese at the Hollywood Walk of Fame in 2009.

Reese was about to embark on a vacation with her husband when her agent offered her a lead role in an upcoming series called Touched by an Angel. At first, Reese declined the offer because of the stress associated from The Royal Family cancelling. Reese was offered a large sum of money to film the pilot and decided to "talk to God", who ultimately told Reese to "do this for me". Reese then shot the pilot, but it was not initially picked up by network television. However, executive producer, Martha Williamson, believed it could be successful if the pilot was retooled to focus more on religion. In 1994, Touched by An Angel officially aired on CBS. Also starring Roma Downey, who was a young, unfamiliar actress, at the time, in the role of Monica (a guardian angel), with Reese, in the role of Tess (the supervising angel), the premise of each episode focused on the angels helping people cross over from life into death. Reese sang the theme song which appeared at the beginning of each episode and was titled "Walk with You".

Despite negative critical reviews and CBS threatening to take it off the air, the series attracted roughly 25 million viewers weekly and was one of the CBS network's top rated shows for three seasons. Reese credited its success to audiences who felt inspired to "change their minds and change their lives". During her time on the series, Reese contested her salary with CBS. Holding a press conference in 1997, Reese claimed that CBS had given Downey a 100 percent salary increase while she only received a 12.5 percent salary increase. "They wanted to give everybody else a raise, and they didn't want to give me a raise, and I couldn't accept that. Just that simple," she explained in an interview. One year later, the dispute was settled when CBS agreed to increase her salary from $40,000 to $100,000 per episode. Touched by an Angel ran for six more years until its ending in 2003.

Reese continued her acting career in the 2000s and 2010s decades. Reese and husband Franklin Lett filmed several television movies for CBS in the 2000s such as The Secret Path and Anya Bell. She appeared in a film about a black-owned hair salon starring Queen Latifah called Beauty Shop (2005). She then was featured in a film about the upbringing of Markus Redmond titled If I Had Known I Was a Genius (2007) alongside Whoopi Goldberg, Sharon Stone and Tara Reid. She also appeared in several Christmas-themed television films such as Christmas Angel and Dear Secret Santa on the Lifetime network Her last acting credits were on two episodes of the show Signed, Sealed, Delivered and then Reese retired from acting in 2014.

== Books and ministry ==
Reese was the author of several books in addition to her acting and singing careers. Her first book was Angels Along the Way: My Life from Help Above was released by G. P. Putnam's Sons and was released in 1997. Co-written by Franklin Lett and Mim Eichler, the book was a biography of Reese's life up to that point. In 1999, Reese released a fictional children's book about spirituality called God Inside of Me. Her third book was released in 2001 titled What Is This Thing Called Love?, a series of passages and scriptures centered on love. A fourth book released the same year titled Strength Is the Energy of God! focused on discussing spiritual and inspirational strength. Her fifth and final book was released in 2012 titled Metaphysically Speaking: The Bible is the Greatest How-To Book Ever Written. Published by Reese's own company, it provided guidance on how to find one's own spirituality.

Reese stopped attending church in her 20's after finding it did not agree with her spiritual beliefs. After a near-fatal accident in 1979, Reese became inspired by Reverend Johnnie Colemon, the founder of the non-denominational Universal Foundation for Better Living church. She started attending services and took theological course work at the Johnnie Colemon Institute. She then began hosting classes at her California home beginning in 1984. Reese officially became an ordained minister in 1987 and founded her own church called Understanding Principles for Better Living. The "Up Church" is under Colman's Universal Foundation for Better Living. In her ministerial work, she was known as the Rev. Dr. Della Reese Lett.

== Personal life ==
=== Marriages and children ===
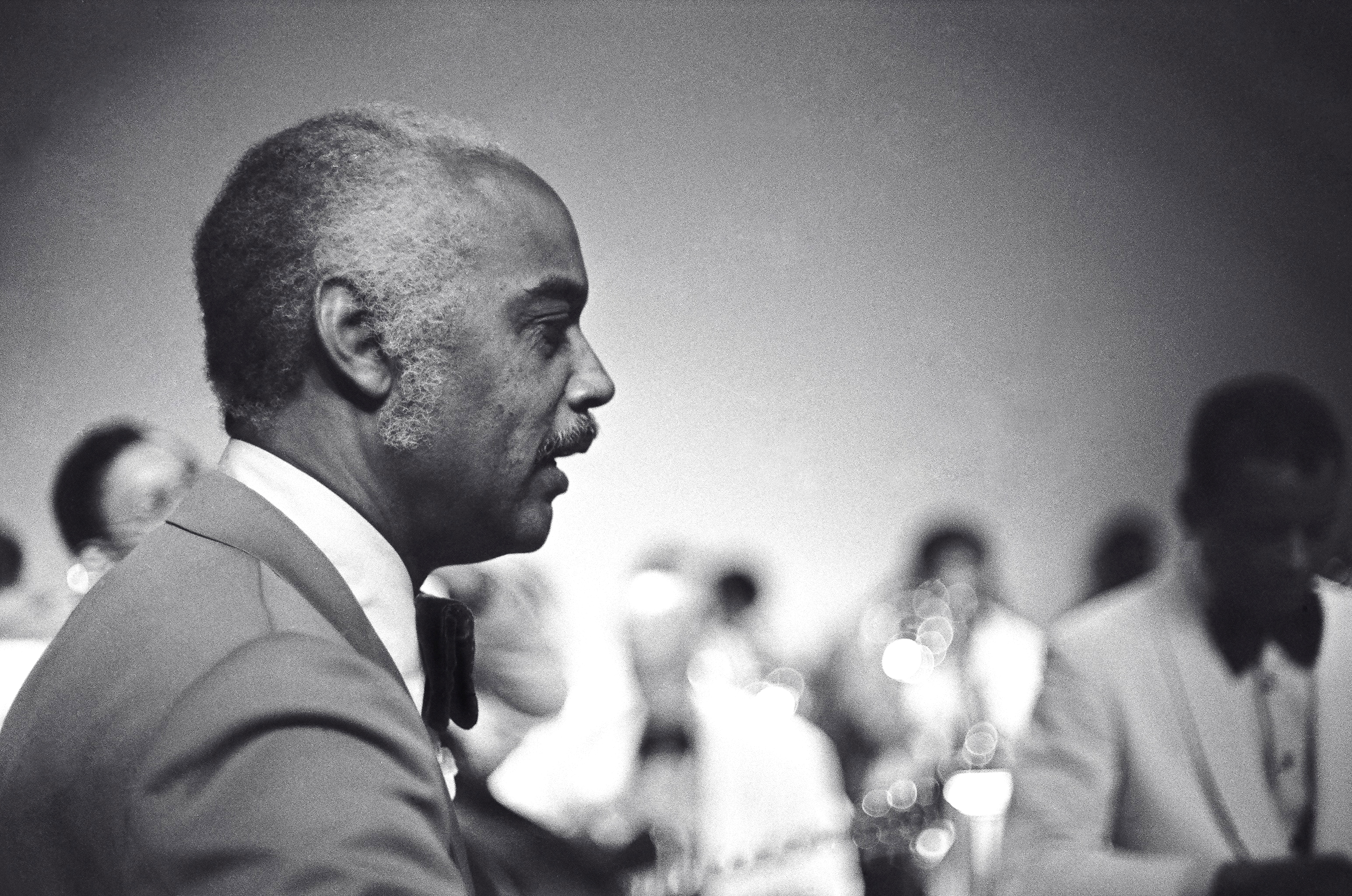
Reese was briefly married to Mercer Ellington, the son of Duke Ellington (pictured here in 1975.)

Reese was married four times. Her first marriage was in 1952 to Vermont Taliaferro, a factory worker who was nineteen years older than her. The pair divorced in 1958. According to Reese, Taliaferro was abusive and with Ed Sullivan's intervention, the marriage ended. Her second marriage was in 1959 to accountant, Leroy Gray, which ended 1961. Reese ended the marriage because Gray did not tell her that the divorce from his ex-wife was invalid. In 1961, Reese married Duke Ellington's son, Mercer Ellington. However, the marriage was also annulled because he received an invalid Mexican divorce with his previous marriage. Reese then agreed not to get married again. However, she did marry for a final time to concert promoter, Franklin Lett. They remained married from 1983 until Reese's death. Reese had two stepchildren from Lett's previous marriage: Dominque Lett and Franklin Lett III. In a 2004 interview, Reese commented of her marriage to Lett, "He's my friend. He's my lover. He's my running buddy. He's my husband. He's my manager. He is absolutely my everything."

Reese adopted the daughter of her half-brother named Deloreese Daniel Owens. In the same 2004 interview, Reese stated that her brother and sister "had five children that they were having a terrible time feeding and abortion was not as easily come by". Reese offered to adopt the child which her sister-in-law first agreed to. However, after giving birth, her sister-in-law chose to keep the baby. Two years later when Reese was working a club in Chicago, they brought the baby to her and reportedly told her, "I should have given you the baby when I said I would." Reese then went on to officially adopt her. Owens died in March 2002 at 41 years old, which was said to be caused by a "pituitary dysfunction", according to the Los Angeles Times.

=== Health challenges ===
In September 1970, Reese was with her daughter playing in the swimming pool of her California home when she slipped and fell on a piece of tile. She subsequently fell through a plate glass window. Reese's daughter found a neighbor (who also happened to be a doctor) to help her contact paramedics. According to the Tucson Daily Citizen, Reese had "severe body lacerations" when she arrived at the UCLA Medical Center. The newspaper also reported that she underwent a three-hour surgery to repair the injury and remained in the hospital for nearly one month. "[Doctors said] I was gonna die so many times, I may not die at all". Ultimately, she received one thousand stitches and made a full recovery with the help of physical therapy.

While singing "Little Boy Lost" on a taping of The Tonight Show, being guest hosted by Richard Dawson, in October 1979, Reese suffered a brain aneurysm. According to Reese, she was taken to two Los Angeles hospitals, which assumed she had a drug "overdose" because she was "Black and an entertainer". Reese's son, a psychiatrist, sent for her physician who "came immediately" to prove there were no drugs in Reese's system. A test officially revealed the aneurysm and Reese was sent to a brain surgeon at a London, Ontario hospital. The surgeon ultimately performed a five-hour surgery on Reese before she lost vision in her left eye. She ultimately made a full recovery and credited her spiritual faith in helping her recover.

=== Friendships ===
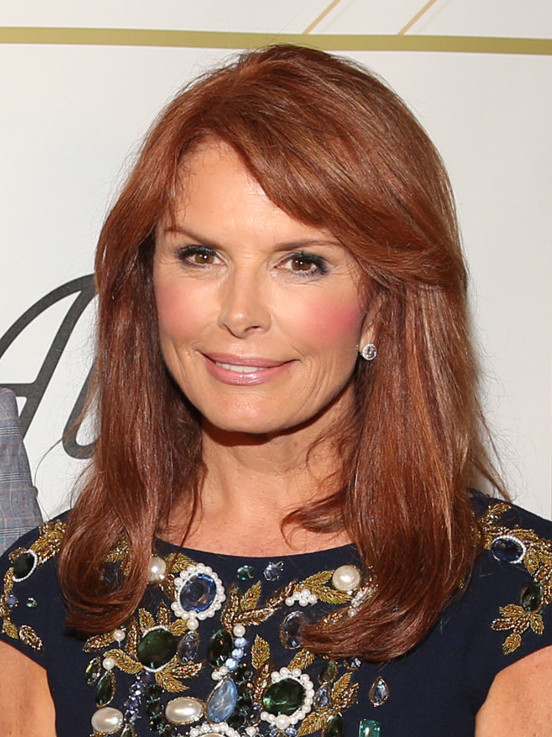
Reese was close friends with Touched by an Angel co-star, Roma Downey (pictured here in 2015).

In addition to working alongside Redd Foxx on The Royal Family, the pair were also friends. "We were hungry together. We were out of work together. We shared sandwiches together. We were friends," Reese remembered in an interview. Reese was also close friends with Touched by an Angel co-star, Roma Downey. In an interview following Reese's death, Downey said she "was like a mother to me". Downey considered her a "second mother" and made Reese the godmother to her daughter who was born in 1996. Reese also officiated Downey's wedding to Mark Burnett. Downey was quoted as saying, "I think I'll just always remember the feel of her neck against my cheek when she hugs me and the love I know that she has for me and the love that I feel for her and the love that she has for God. To know Della is to know that she loves God.

=== Death ===
Reese was diagnosed with type 2 diabetes after collapsing on the set of Touched by an Angel. It was initially controlled with medication and a calorie deficit. In 2016, shortly after her 85th birthday, Reese was said to be in poor health and had undergone multiple surgeries. She stated that she had neglected her health for years, which had contributed to the disease getting gradually worse over time. She was using a wheelchair at times on and off during the last ten years of her life. Reese died at her home in the Encino neighborhood of Los Angeles on November 19, 2017, at the age of 86. Reese was honored with a memorial service in December 2017 that included Roma Downey.

== Discography ==
Studio albums

- Melancholy Baby (1956)
- Amen! (with her Meditation Singers) (1958)
- The Story of the Blues (1959)
- What Do You Know About Love? (1959)
- Della (1960)
- Della by Starlight (1960)
- Della Della Cha-Cha-Cha (1960)
- Special Delivery (1961)
- The Classic Della (1962)
- Waltz with Me, Della (1963)
- Moody (1965)
- C'mon and Hear Della Reese! (1965)
- "i like it like dat!" (1966)
- Della on Strings of Blue (1967)
- I Gotta Be Me...This Trip Out (1968)
- Black Is Beautiful (1970)
- Right Now (1970)
- Let Me in Your Life (1973)
- Sure Like Lovin' You (1983)
- Della Reese and Brilliance (with Brilliance) (1986)
- Give It to God (2006)

== Filmography ==
Films

- Psychic Killer (1975)
- Harlem Nights (1989)
- A Thin Line Between Love and Hate (1996)
- Chasing Secrets (1999)
- Dinosaur (2000)
- Beauty Shop (2005)
- If I Had Known I Was a Genius (2007)
- Expecting Mary (2010)
- Meant to Be (2012)
- Me Again (2012)

== Books ==
- Angels Along the Way: My Life from Help Above (1997) (with Franklin Lett and Mamie Eichler)
- God Inside of Me (1999)
- What Is This Thing Called Love? (2001)
- Strength Is the Energy of God! (2001)
- Metaphysically Speaking: The Bible is the Greatest How-To Book Ever Written (2012)
