= The Meditation Singers =

- Genres: Christian: Gospel

The Meditation Singers was a Gospel music group formed by Ernestine Rundless in the late 1940s. The original members were Earnestine Rundless, DeLillian Mitchell, Marie Waters, and Waters' sister, Deloreese Early, later known as Della Reese. Della Reese left the group in 1953 and was replaced by Laura Lee, Rundless's daughter.
