= And That Reminds Me =

Popular song

"And That Reminds Me", also known as "My Heart Reminds Me", is a popular song.

== Background ==
The music was based on the Italian instrumental, "Concerto d'autunno," by Camillo Bargoni. As "Autumn Concerto", it reached the Music Vendor pop survey in versions by Richard Hayman and Carmen Cavallaro. The English language lyrics were written by Al Stillman and Paul Siegel.

== Recorded versions ==
- First noted recording is by the Italian singer Flo Sandon's (May 2, 1956).
- Johnny Dorelli recorded in Italy a version in English in 1956 with the original title "Concerto d'autunno" with the lyrics by Siegel.
- The first recorded version in English was done by Della Reese and The Honey Dreamers in 1957, under the title "And That Reminds Me" (Jubilee Records catalog number 5292), and it reached number 23 on the weekly Billboard Best Seller chart, and number 29 in the Top 100 chart. It also peaked at number 16 on Cashbox's Best Seller chart.
- Kay Starr came out with another version under the title "My Heart Reminds Me" (RCA Victor Records catalog number 47-6981), which entered the Jockeys chart a week after Reese's and reached number 9. The song (in both versions, combined) peaked at number 15 on the Cashbox chart that year.
- Edna McGriff (1957)
- Jane Morgan and The Troubadours - included in her album Fascination (1957).
- Timi Yuro - for the album Hurt!!!!!!! (1961)
- Dean Martin - for the album Dino: Italian Love Songs (1962)
- Julie London - included in her album Love Letters (1962)
- Jerry Vale - Till the End of Time (1964)
- Vikki Carr - for her album The Way of Today! (1966)
- Sergio Franchi on his 1966 album, La Dolce Italy
- Carmen McRae - The Sound of Silence (1968)
- Al Martino - This Is Al Martino (1968)
- The song was revived in 1969 by The Four Seasons, a version that reached number 45 on the Billboard Hot 100 chart. (see The Four Seasons singles discography)
