= Don't You Know? =

Single by Della Reese

from the album The Classic Della
- B-side: "Soldier, Won't You Marry Me?"
- Released: August 28, 1959
- Recorded: 1959
- Genre: R&B, classic pop
- Length: 2:28
- Label: RCA Victor
- Songwriter: Bobby Worth

Della Reese singles chronology
"Sermonette" (1959)	"Don't You Know?" (1959)	"And Now" (1960)

"Don't You Know?" is a 1959 popular song written by Bobby Worth, and hit record for singer Della Reese.

The song was adapted from an aria ("Musetta's Waltz") from Puccini's La bohème. It was Reese's first single on her new label RCA Victor and helped her get a nomination for a Grammy Award for Best Female Vocalist.

Previously entitled "You," the song had also been a hit for Sammy Kaye in 1952, reaching number 28.

== Chart performance ==
It became Reese's biggest hit, reaching number 1 on the US R&B chart. "Don't You Know?" went to number 2 on the US Pop chart, where "Mack the Knife" by Bobby Darin kept it from number 1. It was a follow-up to her previous big hit, "And That Reminds Me". "Don't You Know?" charted in South Africa in 1975, where it peaked at number 2 on Springbok Radio Top 20 in May 1975. The song charted for 14 weeks.
