= Alan Jones (drummer) =

American drummer (born 1962)

- Born: August 5, 1962; Longview, Washington, U.S.
- Genres: Modal jazz, avant-garde jazz, hard bop, post-bop
- Occupations: Musician, Bandleader, Composer, Educator
- Instruments: Drums, multi-instrumentalist
- Years active: 1978 - Present
- Website: www.alanjonesdrummer.com

Alan Jones (born August 5, 1962) is an American jazz drummer, composer and educator. Born in Longview, Washington, he moved to Portland, Oregon at an early age and took up the drums and guitar as a young child. Jones' first experience in his early career was with Count Dutch, an organist from Amsterdam who hired Jones to work with him as a drummer. His first album was Unsafe which was published in 1998.

== Biography ==
=== Early life ===
Jones moved to Portland Oregon at an early age. He began playing the drums and guitar as a young child and had some instruction from local Jazz Pianist and Educator Arletta O'hearn Jones spent his high school years soaking in the vibrant local music scene. "I saw Dexter Gordon when I was in high school," recalls Jones, who sneaked in an upstairs window to soak up the music before he was caught and ejected". Jones was inspired by Jazz musicians Saxophonist Sonny King, John Stowell and Mel Brown as well as Jim Pepper and David Friesen who would help establish his early career. One of the first such experiences was provided by an organist from Amsterdam named Count Dutch, who hired Jones to work with him on the road after hearing him play at one of Dutch's jam sessions. These tours also presented an opportunity to play extensively with Saxophonist Jim Pepper, a relationship that Jones would build on in the future. This musical period lasted until Dutch's premature death three years later.

=== The 1980s: early tours and New York ===
After moving to Boston in 1980 Jones graduated from the Berklee College of Music where he studied with the jazz drummer Alan Dawson. During this time he spent two summers at the Banff Center for the Fine Arts in Canada and also made appearances in his home town of Portland. Jones moved to New York City in 1984 and as a tenant of the same Brooklyn apartment building as Jim Pepper and bassist Ben Wolfe, where he organized many jam sessions.

In 1985 while still in New York City, Jones met Canadian Saxophonist Phil Dwyer and they both performed as members of the David Friesen trio, a tenure which lasted into the next decade.

=== 1988—1995: Europe ===
In 1988, Jones moved to Europe splitting his home between Vienna and Paris. This led to Jones sharing leadership and compositional duties with bandmates in The Fensters and performing at Europe's leading jazz festivals. This also coincided with tours of England, France, Germany, Belgium, the Netherlands, Austria, Hungary, Spain, Portugal, Italy and the Czech Republic.

During his time in Europe, Jones also continued to tour with The David Friesen Trio throughout the U.S. and extensively up and down the West Coast as well as additional dates in Canada with Kenny Wheeler. During this time Jones made a number of recordings with this group including David Friesen's well received 1989 release Other Times, Other Places.

In the early 1990s Jones continued to perform with Friesen as a member of his quartet with saxophonist John Gross and Trumpeter Gary Barone.

=== 1996—2004: The Alan Jones Sextet ===
Upon returning to Portland in 1996, Jones stepped further into the roll of band leader and composer with the formation of The Alan Jones Sextet. Jones leveraged John Gross and Randy Porter from earlier work in David Friesen's group as well as other Portland musicians. Their recording first established Jones working with Gino Vannelli, who produced their first recording, Unsafe.

As a composer, Jones' work was described by music critic Jim Strupp as "intelligent explorations on familiar jazz forms" whose "arrangements are interesting and accessible". This group went on to record three albums and the sextet which emphasized Jones compositions, represented a chance for Jones to more fully explore his creative output as a composer. "It's Jones' compositions that are primarily responsible for the excitement" wrote Lynn Darroch of The Oregonian which is echoed in yet another review from this period "The Sextet's sound is primarily the result of Jones' vision and courage."

In 2001 Jones was commissioned by production designer and puppet artist Michael Curry to write the music for a large stage production called Spirits. The result was a jazz and world music infused score for dance and theater the sound track of which was released independently on Jones' own label record.

=== 2005—2007: Germany ===
In 2005 Jones move back to Europe this time living in Germany where he worked with Olaf Polziehn and Peter Bolte Quartet, among others.

=== 2008—present ===
In 2008, Jones returned to reside in Portland, Oregon. In May of that year, Jones opened a jazz club called The Cave.

In the Summer of 2013 Jones toured Canada with his Alan Jones, a Canadian Sextet featuring Phil Dwyer, Seamus Blake, Ingrid Jensen, Jon Ballantyne and Tom Wakeling.

In 2014, Jones put together a new Portland based sextet with Greg Goebel, Charlie Porter, John Nastos, Nicole Glover and Jon Lakey.

In 2025, Jones was given the "Jazz Hero Award" by the Jazz Journalists Association for his contributions with AJAM and the Pacific Northwest music scene. Former winner Lynn Darroch commented on Jones for this honor:

"His Alan Jones Academy of Music (AJAM) is a shoe-string endeavor in a city with more than a dozen established jazz education programs, both public and private. But AJAM has a unique appeal: It’s designed for participants who are either on track to become professional musicians or already playing professionally. And many notable Portland artists have passed through or are still participating in the program. Perhaps the most-renowned of his alumni is saxophonist Nicole Glover, a rising star in New York City now and a member of the group Artemis."

=== Career as an educator ===
After teaching at Portland State University in 2010, Jones went on to establish the Alan Jones Academy of Music. The school describes itself as "an education system focused on personal and collective improvisation" that "works with students of all ages". Students have been involved in projects ranging from collaborating with Michael Curry on multimedia stage presentations, playing at international jazz festivals and has received prestigious scholarships. Jones also works as a clinician and private instructor while continuing an active world-wide recording and touring schedule.

== Discography ==
=== As leader ===
Recorded	Album	Personnel	Label
1998	Unsafe	Alan Jones, John Gross, Warren Rand, Paul Mazzio, Randy Porter, Dan Schulte	Alan Jones Music
2001	Spirits	Alan Jones, Gary Versace, David Friesen, Rob Davis, Jay Thomas, Janet Chvatal, Kamau Sadiki,	Alan Jones Music
2003	Leroy Vinnegar Suite	Alan Jones, John Gross, Warren Rand, Paul Mazzio, Randy Porter, Dan Schulte, Leroy Vinnegar	Alan Jones Music
2006	Let Me Tell You About My Day	Phil Dwyer, Rodney Whitaker, Alan Jones,	Alma Records
2007	Day	Alan Jones, Phil Dwyer, Darrell Grant, Tom Wakeling	Origin
2007	Night	Alan Jones, Phil Dwyer, Darrell Grant, Tom Wakeling	Origin
2010	Climbing (Rough)	Alan Jones, John Gross, Warren Rand, Paul Mazzio, Randy Porter, Dan Schulte	Alan Jones Sextet
2011	Another View	Alan Jones, Francois Theberge, Marilyn Keller, Rebecca Kilgore, Dan Tepfer, Tom Wakeling, Glen Moore, Ja'tik Clark, Dan Balmer, John Gross, Lars Campbell, Tim Bryson, John Moak, Jon Ramm-Gramenz, Matt Warming, Ian Kerr, Erin Winemiller, Mattie Kaiser, Jeremy Genet, Anne-Sophie Libra	Origin
2015	Storyline	Alan Jones, Charles Porter, John Nastos, Nicole Glover, Greg Goebel, Jonathan Lakey	Alan Jones Music
2021	You Took Me Home	Alan Jones	Alan Jones Music

=== As a sideman ===
Recorded	Album	Personnel	Label
1992	Jazz Music Vol 1	Alan Jones, Andy Middleton, Paul Imm, Francois Theberge	Arta Records
1994	One Two Three	David Friesen, Randy Porter, Alan Jones	Burnside Records
1989	Other Times, Other Places	David Friesen, Randy Porter, Alan Jones, Airto Moreira, Denny Zeitlin	Global Pacific
1998	Tomorrow's Dreams	David Friesen, Jay Thomas, Alan Jones, Randy Porter, Ulli Dinter, Janet Chvatal	Shamrock
1995	Seven Stars	Suzi Stern, Denny Zeitlin, Alan Jones, David Friesen	Mad Moon Records
2000	Nomads Notebook	Andy Middleton, Ralph Towner, Dave Holland, Alan Jones	Intuition Records
2007	Beyond The Fragile Geometry of Space	Peter Bolte, Paul Imm, Paul Heller, Alan Jones, Henning Berg	Merfadéz Music
1994	Jazz Music Vol X	Alan Jones, Andy Middleton, Paul Imm, Francois Theberge	A Records
1997	Rough Jazz	Gordon Lee, Alan Jones, John Gross, Dan Schulte	Riverside
2006	Keeping Import	Peter Bolte, Achim Kaufmann, Paul Imm, Alan Jones	JHM Records
2006	Live at Jazztone Lörrach	Scott Hamilton, Olaf Polziehn, Ingmar Heller, Alan Jones	Satin Doll Productions
2005	Open Time	Jochen Feucht, Olaf Polziehn, Christian Ramond, Alan Jones, Stephanie De Secondi,	Sendesaal Deutschlandfunk
