= Mike Wofford =

American jazz musician (1938–2025)

- Wofford in 2023

Background information
- Born: February 25, 1938; San Antonio, Texas, U.S.
- Died: September 19, 2025 (aged 87) San Diego, California, U.S.
- Genres: West Coast jazz; bebop
- Occupation: Musician; composer
- Instrument: Jazz piano
- Labels: Epic; Milestone; Discovery; Flying Dutchman; Trend; Concord Jazz; Azica Records; Heavywood Records; Capri
- Spouse: Holly Hofmann (m. 2000)
- Website: mikewofford.com

Michael Wofford (February 25, 1938 – September 19, 2025) was an American jazz pianist and composer. He was an accompanist to singers Sarah Vaughan (in 1979) and Ella Fitzgerald (1989–1994). He was known in the jazz community going back to the 1960s for the albums Strawberry Wine and Summer Night. He performed with Shorty Rogers, Bud Shank, Joe Pass, Shelly Manne, Kenny Burrell, and Zoot Sims.

== Life and career ==
Michael Wofford was born in San Antonio, Texas, on February 28, 1938; at age five, he and his mother moved to San Diego, California. At age seven, he began taking classical piano lessons at a local music store. He admired men such as Béla Bartok, Igor Stravinsky, Paul Hindemith, John Cage, and Art Tatum. Wofford was introduced to jazz by a combination of his mother, who had been a professional singer prior to being married, and radio.

Wofford attended Point Loma High School, where he embraced his love for jazz as a sophomore. He played in area bands with men such as John Guerin, Don Sleet, and Gary Lefebvre. At age 19, the San Diego Symphony performed two compositions of his which he had written at age 14 and 18 respectively. He attended San Diego State College but dropped out after a semester due to lack of devotion.

In 1959, he accepted an invitation to play in Howard Rumsey's band, the Lighthouse All Stars. After moving to Los Angeles, he was featured as the pianist in Mel Tormé's 1962 album Comin' Home Baby!. Through an association with Oliver Nelson, he also worked on TV-film scoring for works such as M*A*S*H, The Godfather, The Godfather Part II, The Merv Griffin Show, The Bill Cosby Show, and You've Got Mail; he also did pop-music sessions with figures such as Joan Baez, The Jackson 5, John Lennon, and Cher.

In 1964, record producer Albert Marx discovered Wofford and signed him and his trio (John Guerin on drums and John Doling on bass) to Epic Records. In 1966, Wofford released his first solo album, Strawberry Wine, which received critical acclaim. He continued touring with various prominent artists and recording before moving back to San Diego in the late 1970s. He continued to work with various artists, including George Lewis, Sérgio Mendes, Quincy Jones, James Moody, Harry Nilsson, Zoot Sims, John Klemmer, Sarah Vaughan, and Ella Fitzgerald, becoming the latter two's pianist and conductor from 1979 to 1983 and 1989 to 1994 respectively.

In 2000, Wofford married flutist Holly Hofmann; they recorded a 2006 duo album together at the Athenaeum Music & Arts Library in the San Diego neighborhood of La Jolla.

Wofford fathered three children: Melissa, Christopher, and Michael.

Wofford died from hyponatremia on September 19, 2025, at the age of 87.

== Discography ==
=== As leader ===
- Strawberry Wine (Epic, 1966) with John Doling, John Guerin
- Summer Night (Milestone, 1968) with Monty Budwig, John Guerin
- Scott Joplin: Interpretations '76 (Flying Dutchman, 1976) with Chuck Domanico, Shelly Manne
- Afterthoughts (Discovery, 1978)
- Mike Wofford Trio Plays Jerome Kern Vol. 1 (Discovery, 1980) with Jim Plank, Andy Simpkins
- Mike Wofford Quartet Plays Jerome Kern Vol. 2 (Discovery, 1980) with Tom Azarello, Anthony Ortega, Jim Plank
- Mike Wofford Trio Plays Jerome Kern Vol. 3 (Discovery, 1981) with Jim Plank, Andy Simpkins
- Sure Thing (Discovery, 1981) with Tom Azarello, Monty Budwig, John Guerin, Jim Plank, Andy Simpkins
- Funkallero (Trend, 1987) with Sherman Ferguson, Andy Simpkins, Paul Sundfor
- Plays Gerald Wilson "Gerald's People" (Discovery, 1988) with Carl Burnett, Richie Gajate Garcia, Rufus Reid
- Mike Wofford at Maybeck (Concord Jazz, 1991)
- Synergy (Heavywood, 1998) with Joe LaBarbera, Rob Thorsen
- Time Cafe (Azica, 2001) with Duncan Moore, Darek Oleszkiewicz
- Turn Signal (Capri, 2012) with Holly Hofmann
- It's Personal (Capri, 2013)

=== As sideman ===
With Elek Bacsik

- Bird and Dizzy – a Musical Tribute (Flying Dutchman, 1975)

With Kenny Burrell

- Both Feet on the Ground (Fantasy, 1973)

With Gil Fuller

- Night Flight (Pacific Jazz, 1965)

With Richard "Groove" Holmes

- Six Million Dollar Man, (RCA/Flying Dutchman, 1975)

With John Klemmer

- Constant Throb (Impulse!, 1971)

With Shelly Manne

- Jazz Gunn (Atlantic, 1967)
- Perk Up (Concord Jazz, 1967 [1976])
- Daktari (Atlantic, 1967)
- Alive in London (Contemporary, 1970)
- Mannekind (Mainstream, 1972)
- Essence (Galaxy, 1977)
- French Concert (Galaxy, 1977 [1979]) with Lee Konitz

With Oliver Nelson

- Skull Session (Flying Dutchman, 1975)
- Stolen Moments (East Wind, 1975)

With Howard Roberts

- Antelope Freeway (Impulse!, 1971)
- Equinox Express Elevator (Impulse!, 1972)

With Sonny Stitt

- Dumpy Mama (Flying Dutchman, 1975)

With Gerald Wilson

- California Soul (Pacific Jazz, 1968)
- Lomelin (Discovery, 1981)

With Kenny Rankin

- Professional Dreamer (Private Music, 1995)
