= Ambassadorial Scholarships =

Program of the Rotary Foundation

Ambassadorial Scholarships (founded 1947) was a program of the Rotary Foundation. The program ended in 2013 and was replaced by the Rotary Global Grant Scholarship, which expands on the Ambassadorial mission, by now ensuring that every Rotary Scholar advance Rotary's International mission to " promote service to others, promote integrity, and advance world understanding, goodwill, and peace." .

The purpose of the prestigious Ambassadorial Scholarships program was to further international understanding and friendly relations among people of different countries and geographical areas. The program sponsored several types of scholarships for undergraduate and graduate students. While abroad, scholars served as goodwill ambassadors to the host country and gave presentations about their homelands to Rotary clubs and other groups. Upon returning home, scholars shared with Rotarians and others the experiences that led to a greater understanding of their host country.

== Notable alumni ==
- Sadako Ogata of Japan was the UN High Commissioner for Refugees from 1991 until 2004 and received the Seoul Peace Prize in 2000 for her work in more than 40 refugee camps and trouble spots worldwide. She received an Ambassadorial Scholarship in 1951 and attended Georgetown University in Washington, D.C.
- Bill Moyers former White House Press Secretary and prominent U.S. journalist. Moyers is a former director of the Council on Foreign Relations.
- Paul Volcker was chairman of the U.S. Board of Governors of the Federal Reserve System from 1979 to 1987. He received an Ambassadorial Scholarship in 1951 and studied at the London School of Economics.
- Carlos Alberto da Mota Pinto was the former Prime Minister of Portugal.
- Helmut Jahn was a distinguished architect who had earned much recognition since his 1966-67 Ambassadorial Scholarship from Germany to the Illinois Institute of Technology in Chicago. He was visiting professor at Harvard and Yale.
- Roger Ebert of the United States is the only motion picture critic to be awarded the Pulitzer Prize for Film Criticism. He was awarded an Ambassadorial Scholarship in 1964 to study English literature at the University of Cape Town, South Africa.
- Louise Richardson of Ireland is the Vice Chancellor of the University of Oxford. A political scientist with a specialization in the study of terrorism, she is the first woman to lead the university in its nearly 800-year history. She received an Ambassadorial Scholarship in 1977 and studied at University of California, Los Angeles (UCLA).
- Beryl Nashar was named Woman of the Year by the United Nations Association in 1975 for her work with the Red Cross and the Business Professional Women's Organization of Australia. In 1949 she studied geology as an Ambassadorial Scholar at Cambridge University in England.
- Francis Moloi is the high commissioner of South Africa to India. In 2000 he studied at Harvard University as an Ambassadorial Scholar.
- Chiharu Sakai of Japan received first prize in National Power's World Piano Competition in London in 1991 and first prize in the Debussy Contemporary Music in Portugal in 1987. She studied Piano at the Conservatoire Royal de Musique de Bruxelles in 1985 as an Ambassadorial Scholar.
- Yukiko Shiratori of Japan is an author of child education and linguistic books for Japanese children living in Central and South America. She studied at the Women's College of the University of North Carolina as an Ambassadorial Scholar in 1962.
- Prakas Muthuswamy has authored more than 20 cover stories and 50 special journalistic reports in India. He is now the principal correspondent of India Today, India's largest selling English-language newsmagazine, and its other language editions. He studied journalism as an Ambassadorial Scholar at the University of Florida, United States, in the mid-1980s.
- Ricardo Garcia Rodriguez served as the Foreign Relations Minister of Chile from 1987 to 1988. He has also served as Secretary of the Interior and Minister of the Constitutional Tribunal. He was awarded an Ambassadorial Scholarship to study law at the Università degli Studi di Roma in 1955 and has been a member of the Rotary Club of Santiago since 1986.
- Janet Chvatal is an American soprano who has produced and directed over a hundred musical events, galas and concert series in Europe and in the US to support charity organizations for children and disabled adults in the United States, Germany, Ethiopia, and Sri Lanka. She was awarded an Ambassadorial Scholarship to study Opera in Vienna, Austria in 1987.
- Aspen Mays is an American artist who works in photography and other forms of visual media. In 2006, she was awarded the Ambassadorial Scholarship to study in Cape Town, South Africa. Her work has included interpretations of science and collaborations with scientists, such as the work "Sun Ruins."
- Christine Telyan Christine Telyan is now CEO and co-founder of London-based tech company UENI, which helps small business to be online with no hassle and for free. Christine was also recently named one of the Independent's most inspiring female leaders and is in the running for the Telegraph's 50 most ambitious leaders in the UK. In 2004, she was awarded the Ambassadorial Scholarship to study in LSE, London, United Kingdom.
- Michael T. Benson is an author and American academic administrator who currently serves as president of West Virginia University. He was awarded an Ambassadorial Scholarship in 1993 to study history at St. Antony's College, Oxford, earning his DPhil in 1995.
- Jeanne Gang is award-winning architect and designer of the world's two tallest skyscrapers designed by a woman, Aqua and the St. Regis Chicago. Gang earned Ambassadorial Scholarship in 1989 to study at ETH Zurich (Swiss Federal Institute of Technology).
- Juanita Babet Villena-Alvarez is an author, professor, and American academic administrator at the University of South Carolina Beaufort who received the South Carolina Governor's Professor of the Year in 2010. She was awarded the Rotary Ambassador of Goodwill Scholarship from 1987 to 1988 to complete her Magistere (MA) in French literature at the Sorbonne. She is also a Fulbright Program Poland awardee.
