= Right Now (Della Reese album) =

Studio album by Della Reese
- Released: November 1970
- Genre: Pop
- Label: Avco Embassy
- Producer: Hugo & Luigi

Della Reese chronology
Black Is Beautiful (1968)	Right Now (1970)	Let Me in Your Life (1973)

Singles from Right Now
- 1. "Simple Song of Freedom" Released: September 1970; 2. "Billy My Love" Released: October 1970

Right Now is a studio album by American singer, Della Reese. It was released by Avco Embassy Records in November 1970 and was her second album with the record label. The LP was a collection of ten tracks, featuring mostly cover recordings of popular songs from the time period in which it was released. It received promotion via a tour of the United States. Two singles were also featured on the album: "Simple Song of Freedom" and "Billy My Love". The album received a positive review from Billboard, who named it a "Special Merit Pick" in their late 1970 review.

== Background, recording and content ==
Known for her acting and television career, Della Reese first found success as a singer and recording artist. She had commercial success with the top singles "And That Reminds Me" (1957) and "Don't You Know?". She recorded albums for Jubilee and RCA Victor. At the latter, Reese collaborated with production team, Hugo & Luigi. When the pair became presidents of the Avco Embassy label in 1969, they signed Reese to the label. Her second album for the company was 1970's Right Now, which was also produced by Hugo & Luigi. The production for the album was finished around August 1970. The LP consisted of ten tracks which were mostly cover tunes of popular recordings from the era. Among them was Melanie's "Leftover Wine" and the Jack Moran-penned tune, "Skip a Rope". Another track titled "Why Not Now" was composed by Reese herself.

== Release, critical reception, promotion and singles ==
Right Now was released by Avco Embassy Records in November 1970 and was distributed as a vinyl LP, featuring five tracks on either side of the disc. Billboard named the LP one its "Special Merit Picks" for the week of November 21, 1970 and praised Reese's vocal delivery: "The selections give Miss Reese an ideal opportunity to demonstrate her tremendous vocal range, and should be more of a success than her earlier album on this label." Right Now was promoted through a nationwide tour by label executives who gave a "product presentation", according to articles from Billboard and Record World in October 1970. Two singles were included on the LP: "Simple Song of Freedom" (issued in September 1970) and "Billy My Love" (issued in October 1970).

== Track listing ==
Side one
No.	Title	Writer(s)	Length
1.	"Billy My Love"	B. Milo Adamo	3:27
2.	"Simple Song of Freedom"	Bob Darin	3:00
3.	"Love Song"	Randy Newman	3:48
4.	"Brand New Day" (Main theme from the United Artists motion picture The Landlord)	Al Kooper	2:02
5.	"Something"	George Harrison	3:56

Side two
No.	Title	Writer(s)	Length
1.	"Daydream City"	B. Milo Adamo	2:53
2.	"Leftover Wine"	Melanie Saftka	2:47
3.	"Why Not Now"	Della Reese	2:20
4.	"Skip a Rope"	Moran; Tubb	2:46
5.	"What Are You Doing the Rest of Your Life"	A. Bergman; M. Bergman; Legrand	3:36

== Personnel ==
All credits are adapted from the liner notes of Right Now.

- Jack Adams – Engineer
- Mickey Crofford – Engineer
- Hugo & Luigi – Liner notes, producer
- Sammy Lowe – Arranger and conductor
- The Mixed Media – Cover and liner design
- Peter Myers – Arranger and conductor

== Release history ==
Release history and formats for Right Now
Region	Date	Format	Label	Ref.
Various	November 1970	Vinyl LP	Avco Embassy Records	
Various	Circa 2020	Music download; streaming	Unidisc Music	
