= Alive in London =

Live album by Shelly Manne
- Released: 1970
- Recorded: July 30 & 31, 1970; Ronnie Scott's Jazz Club in London, England
- Genre: Jazz
- Length: 41:54
- Label: Contemporary S7629
- Producer: Lester Koenig

Shelly Manne chronology
Outside (1969)	Alive in London (1970)	Mannekind (1972)

Alive in London is a live album by drummer Shelly Manne, recorded at Ronnie Scott's Jazz Club in 1970 and released on the Contemporary label.

== Reception ==
Professional ratings
Review scores
Source	Rating
AllMusic	2.5/5 stars
The Penguin Guide to Jazz Recordings	3.5/4 stars

The AllMusic review by Scott Yanow states: "John Gross is easily the most impressive soloist but in general the well-intentioned music is not all that memorable".

== Track listing ==
1. "Three on a Match" (John Morell) - 10:14
2. "Once Again" (Steve Bohannon) - 9:05
3. "Big Oak Basin" (Gary Barone) - 9:20
4. "Illusion" (Terry Jones) - 6:27
5. "Don't Know" (Morell) - 6:48

== Personnel ==
- Shelly Manne - drums
- Gary Barone - trumpet, flugelhorn
- John Gross - tenor saxophone
- Mike Wofford - electric piano
- John Morell - guitar
- Roland Haynes - bass
