= Antelope Freeway =

Studio album by Howard Roberts
- Released: 1971
- Recorded: December 17, 1970, and March 18 & 23, 1971
- Studio: The Record Plant, Los Angeles
- Genre: Jazz
- Length: 41:10
- Label: Impulse!
- Producer: Ed Michel and Bill Szymczyk

Howard Roberts chronology
Spinning Wheel (1969)	Antelope Freeway (1971)	Equinox Express Elevator (1972)

Antelope Freeway is an album by American jazz guitarist Howard Roberts that was released in 1971 by Impulse! Records.

== Reception ==
The Allmusic review gave the album three stars.

Professional ratings
Review scores
Source	Rating
Allmusic	3/5 stars

Although this is a single disc, the second side is titled « Side Three » and “C”

== Track listing ==
All tracks are written by Howard Roberts except where noted.

No.	Title	Length
1.	"Antelope Freeway" (Howard Roberts/Ed Michel/Bill Szymczyk)	2:25
2.	"That's America fer Ya"	3:25
3.	"Dark Ominous Clouds"	3:45
4.	"De Blooz"	9:27
5.	"Sixteen Track Firemen"	2:15
6.	"Ballad of Fazzio Needlepoint" (Roberts/Brian Garofalo)	5:20
7.	"Five Gallons of Astral Flash Could Keep You Awake for Thirteen Weeks" (Roberts/Szymczyk)	4:23
8.	"Santa Clara River Bottom"	2:20
9.	"Roadwork"	7:50

== Personnel ==
- Howard Roberts – guitar
- Mike Deasy – guitar
- Larry Knechtel, Pete Robinson, Mike Wofford – keyboards
- Robby Bruce – violin
- Max Bennett, Brian Garofalo – bass guitar
- John Guerin, Bob Morin – drums
