= Deana Martin =

American singer

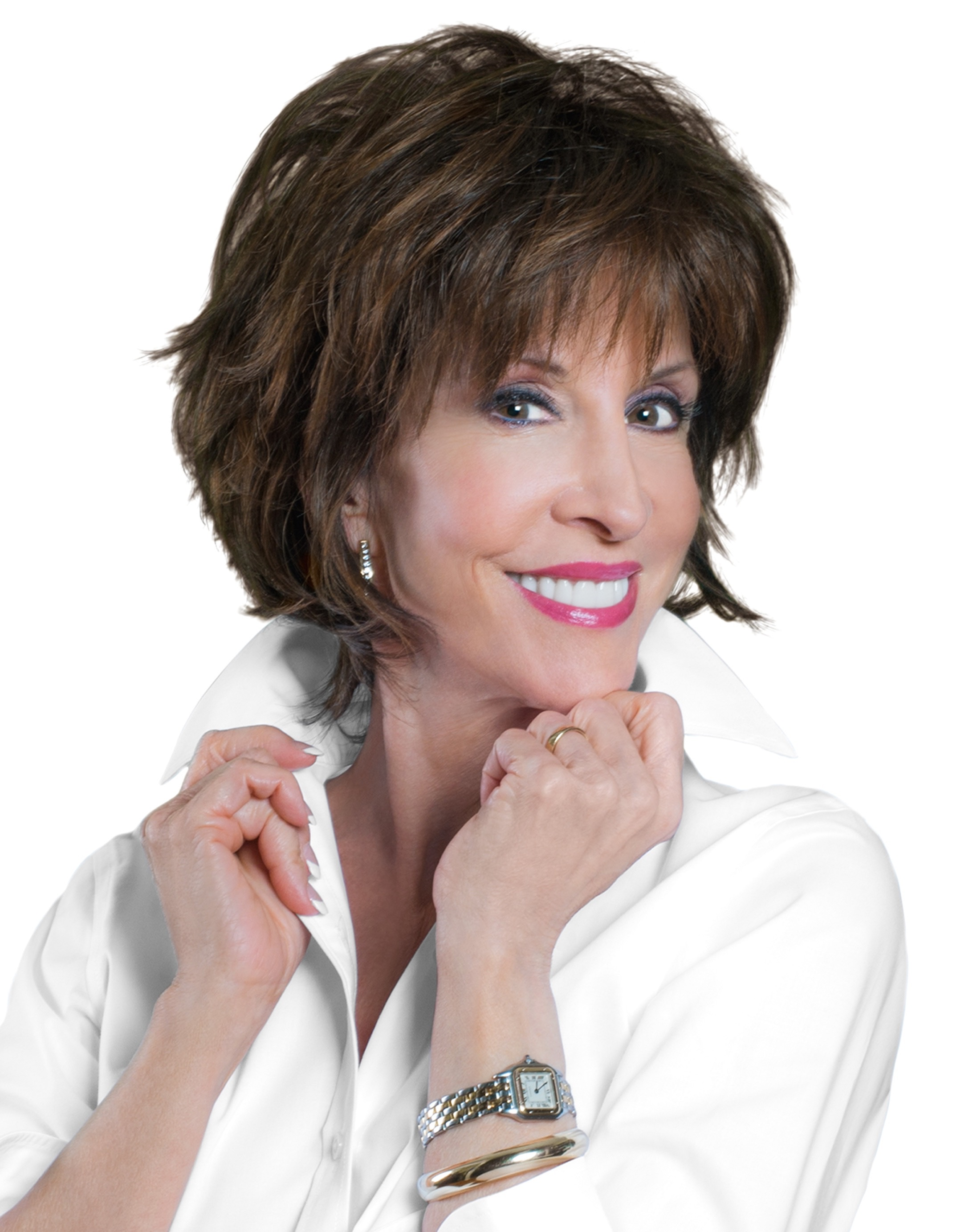
- Martin in 2017
- Born: August 19, 1948 (age 78); New York City, New York, U.S.
- Education: Dartington College of Arts
- Occupations: Singer; actress
- Years active: 1966–present
- Spouse: John Griffeth (m. 1990)
- Father: Dean Martin
- Relatives: Dean Paul Martin (half-brother); Ricci Martin (half-brother)

Deana Martin (August 19, 1948) is an American singer. She is the daughter of singer Dean Martin.

== Film and television ==
Martin was born in Manhattan to Dean Martin and his first wife, Elizabeth Anne "Betty" McDonald. She moved to Beverly Hills, California, with her family by the age of one. She later went to live with her father and his second wife, Jeanne Biegger. During her childhood, it was not unusual for his Rat Pack friends, Frank Sinatra and Sammy Davis Jr., to visit. Being around them persuaded her to pursue a career in entertainment.

Martin trained professionally at the Dartington College of Arts in the United Kingdom. Her theatrical credits include Romeo and Juliet, The Taming of the Shrew, Hamlet, and A Taste of Honey. She co-starred in the National Broadway tour of Neil Simon's play Star Spangled Girl with George Hamilton and Jimmy Boyd. Other starring roles include Wait Until Dark, 6 Rms Riv Vu, A Shot in the Dark, and The Tunnel of Love. She made her major motion picture debut in Young Billy Young with Robert Mitchum, David Carradine, and Angie Dickinson. This debut led to starring roles in the films Strangers at Sunrise with George Montgomery and A Voice in the Night with Vito Scotti.

She made her television debut in 1966 on The Dean Martin Show. She was a frequent guest, performing in musical and comedy numbers with a wide array of entertainers, including Frank Sinatra.

She also appeared on A&E Biography, Access Hollywood, CBS Sunday Morning, Country Music Television, E! Entertainment Television, Entertainment Tonight, Larry King Live, Live with Regis & Kelly, Sky Italia, The Bonnie Hunt Show, The Dating Game (where she chose Steve Martin as her date), The Monkees, The Today Show, The Tony Danza Show, The Big Breakfast, and Bruce Forsyth On Vegas. For four seasons she hosted The Deana Martin Show.

In 2003, Martin appeared with Jerry Lewis on The Jerry Lewis MDA Labor Day Telethon. Martin and Lewis sang "Time After Time".

Since 2021, Martin has hosted Dean and Deana Martin's Nightcap on WABC-770 AM in New York.

== Singing career ==
Martin began her recording career with producer Lee Hazlewood at Reprise Records. The recordings included her country music hit "Girl of the Month Club" while she was a teenager. Other tunes were "When He Remembers Me", "Baby I See You", and "The Bottom of My Mind", all recorded during the 1960s. Musicians from the Wrecking Crew, including Glen Campbell, played on these recordings.

Memories Are Made of This was released in 2006. She covered some of her father's hit songs, including the title cut and "Everybody Loves Somebody", "That's Amore", "Just Bummin' Around", and "For Your Love" written by her mother Betty Martin. She also sang a duet with her father's former comedy partner Jerry Lewis on "Time After Time." The album was produced by her husband John Griffeth and reached the iTunes Top 10 chart, where it remained for 40 weeks throughout 2006 and 2007.

By 2008, after her tour, she was ready to record again. She went into the studio at Capitol Records with the same personnel to record Volare, released in 2009. It debuted at number seven on the Billboard magazine Heat Seek chart, reached No. 22 on the magazine's Jazz Albums Chart, and appeared in the iTunes Top 10 chart. The song "Volare" peaked at No. 40 in Billboard magazine.

In 2011, Martin released White Christmas, her first album of holiday favorites. Joined by Andy Williams on the title track, Martin covered 10 of her favorite tunes, including "I've Got My Love to Keep Me Warm", "Let It Snow! Let It Snow! Let It Snow!", and "Winter Wonderland". She recorded with Al Schmitt, John Griffeth, and Charles Calello. The album was re-released the following year. Martin discussed this re-release with Brad "Martini" Chambers on his show Martini in the Morning on November 20, 2012.

A year later, Martin was back in the studio working on Destination Moon (2013). Her fourth album includes "Break It to Me Gently", "I Love Being Here With You", and "Beyond the Sea" and four new songs: "Read Between the Lines", "Where Did You Learn to Love Like That", "Paradise", and "Stuck in a Dream with Me". She sang a duet with her father on the Cole Porter song "True Love". Swing Street was released in 2016. She talked to Doug Miles about the album on his show.

== Honoring her father ==
For many years, Martin and her husband worked to encourage the state of Ohio to recognize the achievements of her father. In 2001, Ohio Governor Bob Taft signed a bill which made June 7 Dean Martin Day.

Martin performs her father's songs as well as favorite classic pop hits in symphony halls, performing arts centers, blues clubs, jazz clubs, and festivals. She has performed at Caesars Palace in Las Vegas, the Paramount Theatre in New York City, Coral Springs Center for the Arts in Florida, Harrah's Atlantic City, Rrazz Room in San Francisco, Salt Lake City Jazz Festival, Whisky a Go Go in Hollywood, The Sands in Macao, and Benaroya Hall and Symphony Hall in Seattle.

In 2005, Martin was hired by Sirius/XM Satellite Radio. In 2013, she joined Tina Sinatra for her Father's Day Special with Natalie Cole, Monica Mancini, and Daisy Tormé reminiscing about their famous fathers.

In her book Memories Are Made of This: Dean Martin Through His Daughter's Eyes, she shares stories about the Rat Pack from a perspective of a young girl growing up around them. She talks about how her father handled his busy career, public performances, and his role as husband and father, and discusses losing her half-brother, Dean Paul Martin—aka Dino—in a plane crash. Martin writes about growing up around Marilyn Monroe, Elvis Presley, and the Beatles, going ballroom dancing with a young Jeff Bridges, and dating Davy Jones of The Monkees. Her book reached the bestseller list at The New York Times, and, as of September 2012, was the subject of a projected screen adaptation by actors Bonnie Hunt and Joe Mantegna, with Hunt set to write the treatment, Jennifer Love Hewitt to portray Deana, and Mantegna to direct (the latter having himself previously portrayed the elder Martin in the HBO film The Rat Pack). (Note: Although news stories citing the upcoming film appeared as late as January 2016—this time as one of a pair of related films (including both a straight documentary and the Hunter-scripted biopic)—with a planned 2017 release date to commemorate Dean Martin's centennial, both the day and year of Dean Martin's birth came and went with no such film materializing; as of February 2026, Memories Are Made of This is still "categorized as in production" at IMDb.)

In June 2017, Martin headlined a concert commemorating her father's 100th birthday. In an interview published that month, she acknowledged that "of course [the show features] a lot of Dean Martin music, plus 'Uncle' Frank Sinatra, 'Uncle' Sammy Davis Jr., Bobby Darin, a little Ella Fitzgerald. It's all the great songs and then, of course, my own songs. I always honor my dad and all of the music of the Great American Songbook."

== Personal life ==
Martin married film and music producer John Griffeth on February 7, 1990. They had met on a blind date the previous year, and renewed their vows in 2015.

Martin is also a licensed pilot. She was featured in a cover story for the magazine Twin Cessna Flyer and profiled in AOPA Pilot.

== Discography ==
- Memories Are Made of This (Big Fish, 2006)
- Volare (Big Fish, 2009)
- White Christmas (Big Fish, 2011)
- Destination Moon (Big Fish, 2013)
- Swing Street (Big Fish, 2016)

== Bibliography ==
- Martin, Deana; Holden, Wendy (2010). Memories Are Made of This: Dean Martin Through His Daughter's Eyes. New York: Three Rivers Press. ISBN 978-1-4000-9833-0.
