= Black Is Beautiful (Della Reese album) =

1971 album by Della Reese

Studio album by Della Reese
- Released: January 1970
- Studio: RCA (Los Angeles); Mira (New York)
- Genre: Pop
- Label: Avco Embassy
- Producer: Hugo & Luigi

Della Reese chronology
I Gotta Be Me...This Trip Out (1968)	Black Is Beautiful (1970)	Right Now (1970)

Singles from Black Is Beautiful
- 1. "Games People Play" Released: November 1969

Black Is Beautiful is an album by the American singer, Della Reese, released in January 1970 by Avco Embassy Records as her first album with the label. The "soul-inspired" LP was a collection of ten tracks, all of which were covers of popular songs from the era, including "Proud Mary" and "Compared to What". The album reunited Reese with her former producers, Hugo & Luigi, who aimed to market her towards a younger audience. The LP received a positive reaction from music publications and reached the US R&B albums chart in 1970. One single was included: Reese's cover of "Games People Play".

== Background ==
Later known for her acting career, Della Reese was first known as a singer who recorded in the styles of blues, gospel, jazz and pop. She had her greatest commercial success in the late 1950s and early 1960s with the commercially-successful singles, "And That Reminds Me" (1957) and "Don't You Know?" (1959). Her most popular recordings were produced by Hugo & Luigi, a production pair who worked with Reese while she was at the RCA Victor label. Reese's television career was beginning to gain momentum in the late 1960s and she hosted her own talk show during this period titled Della. It was during this period, she reunited with Hugo & Luigi, who signed her to their new label called Avco Embassy. In an interview with Record World explained that with Reese's new television exposure that they would craft an album to target an "under-25 audience".

== Recording and content ==
Black Is Beautiful was produced by Hugo & Luigi at two separate studios in two separate locations: Mira Sound Studios (located in New York City) and RCA Studios (located in Los Angeles, California). Peter Myers conducted and arranged the album's string instrumentation. The LP was a collection of ten songs that contained cover tunes of the era. Covers included on the album were "Games People Play", a song written and first made popular by Joe South. Other cover tunes included "Proud Mary", "Compared to What" and "With Pen in Hand".

== Release and critical reception ==
Black Is Beautiful was released by Avco Embassy Records in January 1970 and was distributed as a vinyl LP. It featured five recordings on each side of the disc. The LP was given a positive critical reception following its release. Billboard magazine wrote, "The popular TV star has a winner in this debut package for the label. She's right in today's selling bag with all the power, drive and soul feel needed to carry her right up the chart." Canada's RPM magazine also praised the album, writing, "Display this set in window. Miss Reese very powerful with 'Cycles', 'Games People Play' and 'Get Together!' Her first LP for label should attract good sales."

== Promotion, chart performance and singles ==
Black Is Beautiful received a positive response and prompted a further dive into album promotion, according to an article from Cash Box magazine. Reese promoted the album by appearing in stores and record shops where the album was sold. Reese also promoted the album on The Merv Griffin Show where she sang "Games People Play". Black Is Beautiful was Reese's first and only album to reach the US R&B albums chart, rising to the number 44 position in April 1970. The only single included on the LP was Reese's cover of "Games People Play", which Avco Embassy first issued in November 1969. The song rose to number 21 on the US Bubbling Under Hot 100 chart in 1970. The single's B-side ("Compared to What") also made the Bubbling Under Hot 100 chart, peaking at number 28.

== Track listing ==
Side one
No.	Title	Writer(s)	Length
1.	"Games People Play"	Joe South	5:12
2.	"Compared to What"	Gene McDaniels	2:49
3.	"Choice of Colors"	Curtis Mayfield	3:09
4.	"Get Together"	Chester Powers	3:40
5.	"With Pen in Hand"	Bobby Goldsboro	4:38

Side two
No.	Title	Writer(s)	Length
1.	"Comment"	Wright; Rehman	3:11
2.	"Proud Mary"	John C. Fogerty	3:35
3.	"You Know How Love Is"	June Jackson	4:24
4.	"Cycles"	Gayle Caldwell	3:14
5.	"If Everybody in the World Loved Everybody in the World"	Bobby Worth	3:05

== Personnel ==
All credits are adapted from the liner notes of Black is Beautiful.

- Bobby Bryant – Track arrangements
- Mickey Crofford – Engineer
- Hugo & Luigi – Liner notes, producer
- Sammy Lowe – Sweetening arrangements
- The Mixed Media – Liner and cover design
- Peter Myers – Arranger, conductor, orchestra, track arrangements
- Bill Raddice – Engineer
- Paul Slaughter – Liner photos
- Joe Wasacz – Illustrator

== Charts ==
=== Weekly charts ===
Chart (1970)	Peak position
US Top R&B/Hip-Hop Albums (Billboard)	44

== Release history ==
Release history and formats for Black Is Beautiful
Region	Date	Format	Label	Ref.
Various	January 1970	Vinyl LP	Avco Embassy Records	
Various	Circa 2020	Music download; streaming	Unidisc Music	
