= Waterfalls (album) =

Live album by John Klemmer
- Released: 1972
- Recorded: June 17 & 22, 1972
- Genre: Jazz
- Length: 41:07
- Label: Impulse!
- Producer: Ed Michel

John Klemmer chronology
Constant Throb (1971)	Waterfalls (1972)	Intensity (1973)

Waterfalls is a live album by American saxophonist and composer John Klemmer featuring studio enhanced live performances recorded in Los Angeles for the Impulse! label.

== Reception ==
The Allmusic review by Scott Yanow awarded the album 4 stars stating it is "Worth investigating by open-eared listeners".

Professional ratings
Review scores
Source	Rating
Allmusic	4/5 stars
The Rolling Stone Jazz Record Guide	3/5 stars

== Track listing ==
All compositions by John Klemmer

1. "Prelude I" – 3:33
2. "Waterfall I" – 4:19
3. "Utopia: Man's Dream, Part 1" – 8:47
4. "Utopia: Man's Dream, Part 2" – 3:50
5. "There's Some Light Ahead" – 4:29
6. "Centrifugal Force" – 5:59
7. "Prelude II" – 4:02
8. "Waterfall II" – 6:08

- Recorded in performance at the Ash Grove in Los Angeles, California on June 17, 1972 and "enchanted" at The Village Recorder in Los Angeles on June 22, 1972

== Personnel ==
- John Klemmer – tenor saxophone, soprano saxophone, echoplex
- Mike Nock – electric piano
- Wilton Felder – electric bass
- Eddie Marshall – drums
- Victor Feldman – percussion
- Diana Lee – vocals (tracks 3, 4 & 6)
