= Outside (Shelly Manne album) =

Studio album by Shelly Manne
- Released: 1970
- Recorded: December 11 & 12, 1969; Contemporary Records Studio, Los Angeles, California
- Genre: Jazz
- Label: Contemporary M3624/S7624
- Producer: Lester Koenig

Shelly Manne chronology
Young Billy Young (1969)	Outside (1970)	Alive in London (1970)

Outside is an album by drummer Shelly Manne recorded in 1969, and released on the Contemporary label. The album marks Manne's return to the label after seven years.

== Reception ==
Professional ratings
Review scores
Source	Rating
AllMusic	3/5 stars

The AllMusic site rated the album 3 stars.

== Track listing ==
1. "River Running" (Gary Barone) - 3:45
2. "Silent Voices" (Pete Robinson) - 8:58
3. "High-Flying Phyllis" (Gene Siegel) - 6:33
4. "Steve" (Steve Bohannon) - 7:35
5. "For Bean" (Juney Booth) - 5:05
6. "Don't Know" (John Morell) - 6:33

== Personnel ==
- Shelly Manne - drums
- Gary Barone - trumpet, flugelhorn
- John Gross - tenor saxophone, flute
- Peter Robinson - piano, electric piano
- Juney Booth - bass
