= Equinox Express Elevator =

Studio album by Howard Roberts
- Released: 1972
- Recorded: January 19, 1972
- Studio: The Village Recorder in Los Angeles, California
- Genre: Jazz
- Length: 35:13
- Label: Impulse!
- Producer: Ed Michel and Bill Szymczyk

Howard Roberts chronology
| Antelope Freeway (1971) | Equinox Express Elevator (1972) | Sounds (1974) |

Equinox Express Elevator is an album by American guitarist Howard Roberts recorded in 1972 for the Impulse! label.

== Reception ==
The Allmusic review awarded the album 3 stars.

Professional ratings
Review scores
| Source | Rating |
|---|---|
| Allmusic | 3/5 stars |

== Track listing ==
All compositions by Howard Roberts except as indicated

1. "Unfolding In" (Roberts, Mike Wofford, Dave Grusin) – 5:13
2. "Timelaps" – 1:51
3. "T T T T" (Roberts, Ed Michel) – 4:43
4. "Growing National Concern" – 3:53
5. "2dB, Eyes of Blue" – 2:03
6. "(The Single) (On This Side)" – 3:03
7. "Real Freak of Nature Historical Monument" – 3:21
8. "Slam" 5:34
9. "Harold J. Ostly, The Country Tax Assessor" – 3:53
10. "Unfolding In (On Itself)" (Roberts, Wofford, Grusin) – 1:39

The album jacket also lists "the reoccurring free rhythm tune – Mavro".

== Personnel ==
- Howard Roberts – electric guitar, 12 string guitar, acoustic guitar, synthesizer guitar, vocals
- Dave Grusin – organ
- Mike Wofford – electric piano
- Ed Michel – synthesizer
- Jerry Scheff – electric bass
- Mayuto Correa – percussion
- Diana Lee – vocals
