= Intensity (John Klemmer album) =

Studio album by John Klemmer
- Released: 1973
- Recorded: August 14, 1971 and February 23, 1973
- Genre: Jazz
- Length: 42:26
- Label: Impulse!
- Producer: Ed Michel

John Klemmer chronology
Waterfalls (1972)	Intensity (1973)	Magic and Movement (1973)

Intensity is an album by American saxophonist and composer John Klemmer, released on the Impulse! label.

== Reception ==
The AllMusic review awarded the album 4 stars.

Professional ratings
Review scores
Source	Rating
AllMusic	4/5 stars
The Rolling Stone Jazz Record Guide	3/5 stars

== Track listing ==
All compositions by John Klemmer

1. "Rapture of the Deep" – 9:20
2. "Love Song to Katherine" – 4:02
3. "Prayer for John Coltrane" – 1:46
4. "Waltz for John Coltrane" – 5:09
5. "(C'mon An') Play With Me" – 3:01
6. "Sea of Passion" – 5:49
7. "Last Summer's Spell" – 13:19

- Recorded at The Kabuki Theatre in San Francisco, California on, August 14, 1971 (tracks 6 & 7) and at The Village Recorder in Los Angeles, California on February 23, 1973 (tracks 1–5)

== Personnel ==
- John Klemmer – tenor saxophone, echoplex, pseudoechoplex, vocals, percussion
- Tom Canning (tracks 1–5), Todd Cochran (Tracks 6 & 7) – electric piano
- James Leary (tracks 6 & 7), Dave Parlato (tracks 1–5) – bass
- Woody Theus – drums, percussion (tracks 6 & 7)
- Victor Feldman – percussion (tracks 1–5)
