= Black, Brown and Beautiful =

Studio album by Oliver Nelson
- Released: 1970
- Recorded: October 1969; Los Angeles, CA
- Genre: Jazz
- Label: Flying Dutchman FDS 116
- Producer: Bob Thiele

Oliver Nelson chronology
| 3-2-1-0 (1969) | Black, Brown and Beautiful (1970) | Zig Zag (1970) |

Black, Brown and Beautiful is an album by American jazz composer/arranger Oliver Nelson featuring performances by a big band recorded in 1969 and first released on the Flying Dutchman label. Selections from the album were released on Nelson's 1976 compilation A Dream Deferred while the title was also used for the CD rerelease of Johnny Hodges album 3 Shades of Blue.

== Reception ==
Douglas Payne called it "A stirring tribute to Martin Luther King that is as searching and angry as it is contemplative and compassionate. Nelson mixes dissonant orchestral moments that nearly lapse into free zones with lovely, more familiar territory which celebrate a joy of love and life. Highly recommended but (as of yet) unissued on CD and very hard to find." The album has since been reissued on CD and is also available as a digital download.

== Track listing ==
All compositions by Oliver Nelson

1. "Aftermath" - 5:29
2. "Requiem" - 7:03
3. "Lamb of God" - 2:28
4. "Martin Was a Man, a Real Man" - 4:08
5. "Self-Help Is Needed" - 4:06
6. "I Hope in Time a Change Will Come" - 2:33
7. "3, 2, 1, 0" - 3:24
8. "Black, Brown and Beautiful" - 3:26
9. "Requiem, Afterthoughts" - 4:00

== Personnel ==
Information is based on the album’s session notes

- Oliver Nelson - arranger (All tracks), conductor (2, 5–7, 9)
- Stanley Wilson - conductor (1, 3–4, 8)
- Orchestra including the following soloists:
- Oliver Nelson - piano (2, 4), alto saxophone (8), soprano saxophone (6, 9)
- Bob Bryant - trumpet (7)
- Chuck Domanico - bass (9)
- John Gross, John Klemmer - tenor saxophone (1)
- John Guerin, Roy Haynes - drums (9)
- Pearl Kaufman (2–3), Roger Kellaway (7, 9) - piano
- Frank Strozier - alto saxophone (5)

Technical

- Ami Hadani - sound mixing
- Chuck Stewart - front cover photography
