= Rotary Scholarships =

Rotary International offers a number of scholarships worldwide for periods of 3 months, 6 months, 1 year and 2 years.

== Ambassadorial Mission ==
The purpose of the Ambassadorial Scholarship was to further international understanding and friendly relations among people of different countries. The scholarship was replaced by the Global Grant Scholarship in 2013.

== General Scholarship Statistics ==
Since 1947, more than 30,000 men and women from 100 nations have studied abroad thanks to Rotary. The Ambassadorial Scholarship program was the world's largest privately funded international scholarships program. More than 1,100 scholarships were awarded for study in 2002-03. Grants totaled US$26 million. Recipients from 69 countries studied in more than 64 nations.

== Types of Scholarships ==
1. Global Grant Scholarship

The Global Grant Scholarship replaced the former prestigious Academic-year Ambassadorial Scholarship in 2013. Scholarship funding is extremely competitive. Some of the differences between Global Grant Scholars and the previous Ambassadorial Scholarships are that Global Grant Scholars must pursue full-time overseas, graduate-level study or research for at least one year that aligns with Rotary's seven areas of focus: Environment; Peace and Conflict Prevention; Community and Economic Development; Basic Education and Literacy; Disease Prevention and Treatment; Water, Sanitation and Hygiene; and Maternal and Child Health. All Global Grant Scholars also aim to "advance Rotary's International mission to promote service to others, promote integrity, and advance world understanding, goodwill, and peace."

2. Peace Scholarship

To pursue a two-year master's degree or certificate in international relations, peace, and conflict resolution at one of the Rotary Centers for International Studies. Locations: Duke University (North Carolina, USA), University of Uppsala (Sweden), Japan, England, Australia.

3. Faculty Scholarship

To teach in a low-income country. $12,500 for 3–5 months or $22,500 for 6–10 months of service. Must have been a university professor for three or more years

4. Group Study Exchange

A team of business and professional people (4 members of ages 25–40 and one Rotarian leader) for four to six weeks visits farms, schools, industrial plants, professional offices, and government establishments. Funds range from $1,000 to $11,000.
