= Mannekind =

Studio album by Shelly Manne
- Released: 1972
- Recorded: 1972
- Genre: Jazz
- Label: Mainstream MRL 375
- Producer: Bob Shad

Shelly Manne chronology
Alive in London (1970)	Mannekind (1972)	Hot Coles (1975)

Mannekind is an album by drummer Shelly Manne, recorded in 1972 and released on the Mainstream label.

== Reception ==
Professional ratings
Review scores
Source	Rating
AllMusic	2/5 stars

The AllMusic review by Scott Yanow states: "Despite a few good solos, this is one of the weaker Shelly Manne albums".

== Track listing ==
1. Birth - 0:30
2. "Scavenger" (Mike Wofford) - 9:36
3. "Seance" (John Morell) - 7:55
4. "Witch's" (Morell) - 4:15
5. Fertility - 0:30
6. Maturity - 0:27
7. "Tomorrow" (Wofford) - 7:50
8. "Pink Pearl" (Morell) - 2:45
9. "Mask" (Wofford) - 7:27
10. Infinity - 0:42

== Personnel ==
- Shelly Manne - drums, berimbau, waterphone, cuca, super balls on cymbals, dahka de bellos
- John Morell - guitar
- Mike Wofford - piano
- John Gross - tenor saxophone
- Gary Barone - trumpet
- Jeffry Castleman - bass
- Brian Moffet - percussion, assorted bells, wind chimes, hi-hat, maracas, tambourine, dahka de bellos
