= Magic and Movement =

Live album by John Klemmer
- Released: 1974
- Recorded: June 22, 1972, July 6, 1973
- Genre: Jazz
- Length: 44:16
- Label: Impulse!
- Producer: Ed Michel

John Klemmer chronology
Intensity (1973)	Magic and Movement (1974)	Fresh Feathers (1974)

Magic and Movement is a live album by American saxophonist and composer John Klemmer featuring studio enhanced live performances recorded in Los Angeles for the Impulse! label.

== Reception ==
The AllMusic review awarded the album 3½ stars.

Professional ratings
Review scores
Source	Rating
AllMusic	3.5/5 stars
The Rolling Stone Jazz Record Guide	2/5 stars

== Track listing ==
All compositions by John Klemmer

1. "Blood of the Sun, Primary Pulse" – 3:40
2. "Blood of the Sun, Secondary Pulse" – 4:36
3. "Blood of the Sun, Tertiary Pulse" – 8:01
4. "How Cum Ya Gotta Rip Off Your Brothers?" – 5:51
5. "Free Love" – 7:41
6. "The Tree of Forbidden Fruit, Alpha Branch" – 6:24
7. "The Tree of Forbidden Fruit, Beta Branch" – 1:53
8. "The Tree of Forbidden Fruit, Gamma Branch" – 6:10

- Recorded in performance at the Ash Grove in Los Angeles, California on June 22, 1972 with overdubs recorded at Royal Hidley Hall in Los Angeles, California on March 19, 1974 (tracks 1–4) and at the Montreux Jazz Festival in Montreux, Switzerland in July 6, 1973 (tracks 5–8)

== Personnel ==
- John Klemmer – tenor saxophone, soprano saxophone, echoplex, phasing, vocals, percussion
- Tom Canning (tracks 5–8), Mike Nock (tracks 1–4) – electric piano
- Wilton Felder – electric bass (tracks 1–4)
- Cecil McBee – bass (tracks 5–8)
- Eddie Marshall (tracks 1–4), Alphonse Mouzon (tracks 5–8) – drums
- Peter Ivers – harmonica (overdubbed on tracks 1–4)
- Dean Parks – electric guitar (overdubbed on tracks 1–4)
