= Young Billy Young =

1969 film by Burt Kennedy

- Theatrical release poster
- Directed by: Burt Kennedy
- Screenplay by: Burt Kennedy
- Based on: Who Rides with Wyatt by Will Henry
- Produced by: Max E. Youngstein
- Starring: Robert Mitchum; Angie Dickinson; Robert Walker Jr. David Carradine; Jack Kelly; Paul Fix
- Cinematography: Harry Stradling Jr.
- Edited by: Otho Lovering
- Music by: Shelly Manne
- Production company: Talbot-Youngstein
- Distributed by: United Artists
- Release dates: September 17, 1969 (Denver, Colorado); October 15, 1969 (United States)
- Running time: 89 minutes
- Country: United States
- Language: English

Young Billy Young is a 1969 Western film in Deluxe Color starring Robert Mitchum and featuring Angie Dickinson, Robert Walker Jr. (in the title role), David Carradine, Jack Kelly (who plays a villain dressed like his character Bart Maverick in the television series Maverick), Deana Martin (in her screen debut) and Paul Fix. The story was based on a 1955 novel by Heck Allen titled Who Rides with Wyatt (written pseudonymously as Will Henry) and the screenplay was by Burt Kennedy; the film was directed by Kennedy. He called it "a bad picture".

== Plot ==
On the trail, Ben Kane, a former Dodge City lawman, comes across Billy Young, who has no horse and was abandoned by partner Jesse Boone soon after their killing of a Mexican general and his staff.

Kane lets young Billy accompany him to a town in New Mexico where he has a job waiting for him as deputy sheriff. Kane's real aim is to find the man who murdered his son.

In town, Kane learns from dance-hall girl Lily Beloit that two men who run the town, John Behan and Frank Boone, secretly intend to gun down Kane first chance they get. Frank Boone may be the one Kane is looking for, but Jesse, who is Frank's son, lands in jail first, accused of shooting Doc Cushman.

Kane and Lily become lovers. Billy, meanwhile, springs Jesse from jail, but feels guilty once Lily reveals to him what happened to Kane's son. After he deals with Behan and the older Boone, the deputy turns in his badge, but recommends Billy for the job.

== Cast ==
- Robert Mitchum as Deputy Ben Kane
- Angie Dickinson as Lily Beloit
- Robert Walker Jr. as Billy Young
- David Carradine as Jesse Boone
- Jack Kelly as John Behan
- John Anderson as Frank Boone
- Paul Fix as Charlie (stagecoach driver)
- Willis Bouchey as Doc Cushman
- Parley Baer as Bell
- Robert Anderson as Gambler (billed as Bob Anderson)
- Rodolfo Acosta as Rurales officer
- Deana Martin as Evvie

== Production ==
Young Billy Young was filmed on location at Old Tucson, Arizona.

== Reception ==
Howard Thompson of The New York Times thought the film seemed like a mediocre television show, however he found Mitchum and Robert Walker Jr. entertaining: "The picture .. contains two casually expert performances by two professionals, namely Mitchum and young Walker, who also share some tangy, amusing dialogue. Even in a walk-through set-up, Mitchum can do laconic wonders with a good wise-crack, such as the devastating one that closes the picture."

== Soundtrack ==
Young Billy Young

Soundtrack album by Shelly Manne
- Released: 1969
- Recorded: 1969
- Genre: Film score
- Length: 29:37
- Label: United Artists; UAS 5199
- Producer: Shelly Manne

Shelly Manne chronology
Daktari (1967)	Young Billy Young (1969)	Outside (1970)

The film score was composed, arranged and conducted by Shelly Manne, and the soundtrack album was released on the United Artists label in 1969. The main title, sung by Robert Mitchum, was also released as a single.

=== Track listing ===
All compositions by Shelly Manne, except as indicated

1. "Young Billy Young (Main Title)" (Shelly Manne, Ernie Sheldon) - 4:09
2. "Mexican Soldiers" - 1:55
3. "Kane's Vision" - 2:42
4. "Stagecoach Stomp" - 2:18
5. "Lily and Kane (Love Theme)" - 3:13
6. "The Train (Pup Tent)" - 2:31
7. "Jail Surrounded" - 3:55
8. "Quicksand" - 3:21
9. "Boone Done In" - 2:24
10. "Young Billy Young (Reprise)" (Manne, Sheldon) - 2:52

== See also ==
- List of American films of 1969
