= Constant Throb =

Studio album by John Klemmer
- Released: 1971
- Recorded: August 12 & 19, 1971
- Genre: Jazz
- Length: 40:44
- Label: Impulse!
- Producer: Stiches

John Klemmer chronology
Eruptions (1970)	Constant Throb (1971)	Waterfalls (1972)

Constant Throb is an album by American saxophonist and composer John Klemmer released on the Impulse! label.

== Reception ==
The Allmusic review awarded the album 4½ stars.

Professional ratings
Review scores
Source	Rating
Allmusic	4.5/5 stars
The Rolling Stone Jazz Record Guide	3/5 stars

== Track listing ==
All compositions by John Klemmer

1. "Constant Throb Part I" – 2:03
2. "Constant Throb Part II" – 6:24
3. "Neptune" – 5:11
4. "Let Me Touch the Wind" – 6:47
5. "California Jazz Dance" – 4:19
6. "Rainbows" – 5:38
7. "Crystaled Tears" – 4:37
8. "Precious Leaf" – 5:45
  - Recorded at Western Recorders in Los Angeles, California on August 12 (tracks 1–3, 5, 6 & 8) and August 19 (tracks 4 & 7), 1971

== Personnel ==
- John Klemmer – tenor saxophone, soprano saxophone, electric piano, percussion, echoplex
- Don Menza – alto flute, bass clarinet
- Mike Lang – piano, electric piano
- Mike Wofford – electric piano, clavinet
- Howard Roberts – guitar
- Wilton Felder, Reggie Johnson – bass
- Jim Keltner, Shelly Manne – drums
- Gary Coleman, Mark Stevens – percussion
- Marni Nixon – vocals (tracks 1 & 2)
