= I Gotta Be Me...This Trip Out =

Studio album by Della Reese
- Released: June 1968
- Genre: Pop
- Label: ABC
- Producer: Lee Magid

Della Reese chronology
Della on Strings of Blue (1967)	I Gotta Be Me...This Trip Out (1968)	Black Is Beautiful (1970)

Singles from I Gotta Be Me...This Trip Out
- 1. "I Gotta Be Me" Released: March 1968

I Gotta Be Me...This Trip Out is a studio album by American singer, Della Reese. It was released in June 1968 by ABC Records and was her fourth studio LP with the label. The album was a collection of 11 tracks, most of which were cover tunes of Top 40 singles from the 1960s decade. It was described as a "return" to her "musical roots". The album received a positive response by most writers and music publications following its release.

== Background ==
Prior to her career as a television actress and talk show personality, Della Reese was a singer who recorded in the styles of blues, gospel, jazz and pop. She found commercial success as a recording artist at Jubilee Records (having a million-selling single with 1957's "And That Reminds Me") and at RCA Victor (which released her 1959 number two single "Don't You Know?"). After a series of well-selling LP's and singles, Reese transitioned to ABC Records in 1965 and recorded several more LP's through 1968. Her final album with ABC was I Gotta Be...This Trip Out. Liner notes author, Frank Kofsky, claimed that Reese was aiming with the album to "move back" towards her "blues and gospel roots". Kofsky stated that she was inspired to do so because more Black artists were receiving mainstream radio airplay.

== Recording and content ==
I Gotta Be Me...This Trip Out consisted of 11 tracks in total, all of which were recorded in Los Angeles, California under the production of Reese's manager, Lee Magid. While planning the LP, Reese contacted Oliver Nelson, who agreed to arrange and conduct the album. Several jazz session musicians were included on the recording sessions, including Ray Brown, Howard Roberts and Earl Palmer. The LP's track listing was a collection of cover tunes that were mostly popular top 40 songs from the era. Among them was The Association's "Never My Love" and the title track was derived from the Broadway musical, Golden Rainbow. Another cover tune was the 1968 Motown single, "For Once in My Life".

== Release, critical reception and singles ==
I Gotta Be Me...This Trip Out was released by ABC Records in June 1968 and was Reese's fourth studio album with the label. It was distributed as a vinyl LP, featuring six tracks on "Side 1" and five tracks on "Side 2". It was available in either mono or stereo formats. The LP received mostly a positive reception from music publications following its release. Billboard magazine named it among its "Special Merit Picks" for their "Popular" music section, writing, "A package loaded with excitement and wild performances in the unique style of the blues-gospel better. Disk destined to garner much play and sales." In his book, Points of Departure, Ernece B. Kelly called Reese's delivery on the album (routinely highlighting the title track) to be "especially forceful". In his book, A Biographical Guide to the Great Jazz and Pop Singers, Will Friedwald gave the album a less favorable response. Friedwald called the LP, "a complete disappointment, being all dreary, bargain-basement Motown-wannabe tunes with board fade endings." The album's title track was the only single from the album and it was first released in March 1968.

== Track listing ==
Side one
No.	Title	Writer(s)	Length
1.	"Never My Love"	Don Addrisi & Dick Addrisi	2:05
2.	"My World Is Empty Without You"	B. & E. Harland; L. Dozier	2:00
3.	"I Gotta Be Me" (from the Broadway musical Golden Rainbow)	Walter Marks	2:16
4.	"Low"	Ben Oakland	3:00
5.	"Go"	Grey; Jourdan; Conara; Baselli	2:30
6.	"Pop Goes the World"	G. Weiss; J. Sherman	2:52

Side two
No.	Title	Writer(s)	Length
1.	"I've Got the Blues"	Marvin Jenkins	3:27
2.	"No Explanation Necessary"	Della Reese	2:05
3.	"For Once in My Life"	R. Miller; O. Murden	2:48
4.	"Hush Now Don't Cry"	Marvin Jenkins	3:13
5.	"Measure of a Man"	A. Bernstein; V. Millrose	2:15

== Personnel ==
All credits are adapted from the liner notes of I Gotta Be Me...This Trip Out.

- Ray Brown, Red Mitchell – Bass guitar
- Sweets Edison – Trumpet
- Henry Epstein – Cover design
- Byron Goto – Cover design
- Plas Johnson – Saxophone
- Roger Kellaway, Kirk Stuart – Piano
- Frank Kofsky – Liner notes
- Joe Lebow – Liner design
- Lee Magid – Producer
- Oliver Nelson – Arranger, conductor
- Earl Palmer, Ed Thigpen – Drums
- Howard Roberts – Solo guitar
- Fred Seligo – Liner photo

== Release history ==
Release history and formats for I Gotta Be Me...This Trip Out
Region	Date	Format	Label	Ref.
Various	June 1968	ABC	Vinyl LP (mono); vinyl LP (stereo)	
Various	June 1968	Stateside	Vinyl LP (mono); vinyl LP (stereo)	
Various	June 1968	Fermata Produções	Vinyl LP (mono); vinyl LP (stereo)	
