= Andy Middleton =

American musician

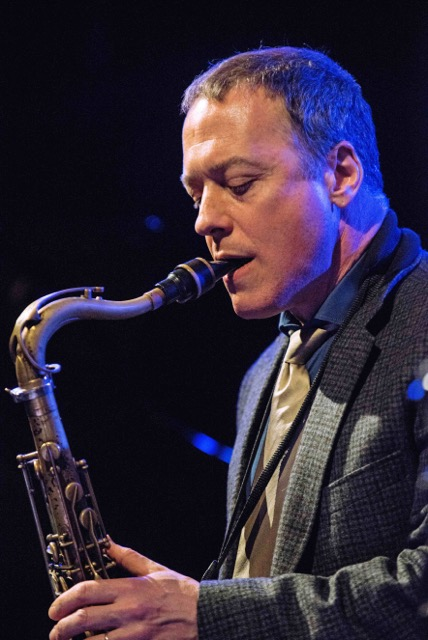

Background information
- Birth name: Andrew Middleton
- Born: May 22, 1962 (age 62); Harrisburg, Pennsylvania, U.S.
- Genres: Jazz, classical music
- Occupation(s): Musician, composer, bandleader, arranger
- Instrument(s): Tenor saxophone, soprano saxophone
- Years active: 1980–present
- Labels: Owl, EMI, Intuition, Qrious, Prova, Alessa, Arta, Panorama, A Records
- Website: andymiddleton.com

Andy Middleton (born May 22, 1962) is an American tenor and soprano jazz saxophonist. He has recorded with Ralph Towner, Dave Holland, Kenny Wheeler, Renee Rosnes, Jamey Haddad, Joey Calderazzo, and Alan Jones.

== Life and career ==
=== Early life ===
Born in Harrisburg, Pennsylvania, Middleton grew up in a musical family and began playing the alto sax at the age of 9. He attended the University of Rochester from 1980 to 1982, then the University of Miami from 1982 to 1987. He met Dave Holland, Kenny Wheeler, Steve Coleman, John Abercrombie, Richie Beirach and David Liebman at the Banff Centre in Alberta, Canada in 1985 and 1986.

Middleton moved to the New York City area in 1987, playing with the Bob Mintzer Big Band, the Lionel Hampton Big Band (who recorded a composition he wrote with his brother Rob Middleton entitled "Two Brothers" on "Cookin' in the Kitchen") and the Maria Schneider Jazz Orchestra. He founded his long-running quartet featuring at various times guitarist Ben Monder, drummers John Hollenbeck, Owen Howard, bassists Scott Colley and Peter Herbert, and pianists Henry Hey, Andy Ezrin, and David Berkman.

Middleton's first album, Acid Rain, featuring Joey Calderazzo, was released in 1991 by the French label Owl Records. His second, Terra Infirma was released in 1995 by EMI France, produced by David Liebman, and featuring the quartet of Middleton, pianist Renee Rosnes, bassist Paul Imm, and drummer Alan Jones augmented by a horn section.

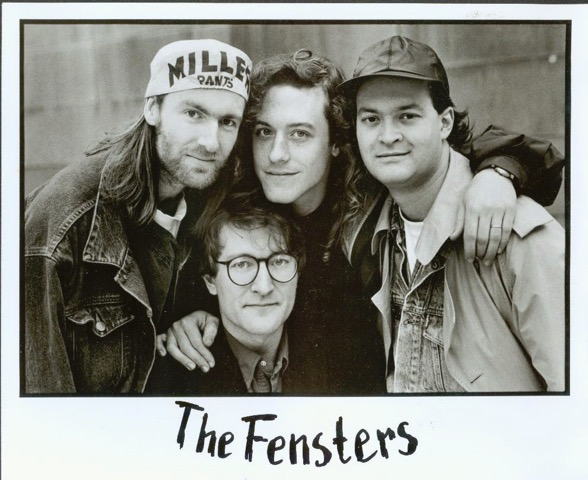
The Fensters, 1990

The Fensters was a two saxophone, bass and drums formation featuring Middleton, Alan Jones, the saxophonist and composer François Theberge, and bassist Paul Imm. The Fensters recorded 2 CDs, "Jazz Music, Vol. 1" in 1992 for the Czech label Arta Records, and "Jazz Music, Vol. X" for the Dutch label Challenge Records sub-label A Records in 1996. In 1999 Middleton recorded his 3rd CD as a leader "Nomad's Notebook" with ECM Records guitarist Ralph Towner on acoustic guitars and piano, Dave Holland on bass, Alan Jones on drums, Noah Bless on trombone and Jamey Haddad on percussion. "Nomad's Notebook" was followed by his 2nd production for the German label Intuition Music and Media featuring trumpeter Kenny Wheeler and trombonist Nils Wogram entitled "Reinventing the World".

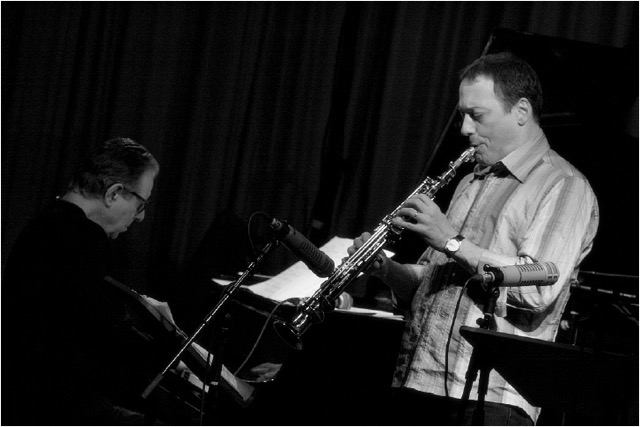

In September, 2006 Middleton moved to Vienna, Austria to teach at the Music and Arts University of the City of Vienna.

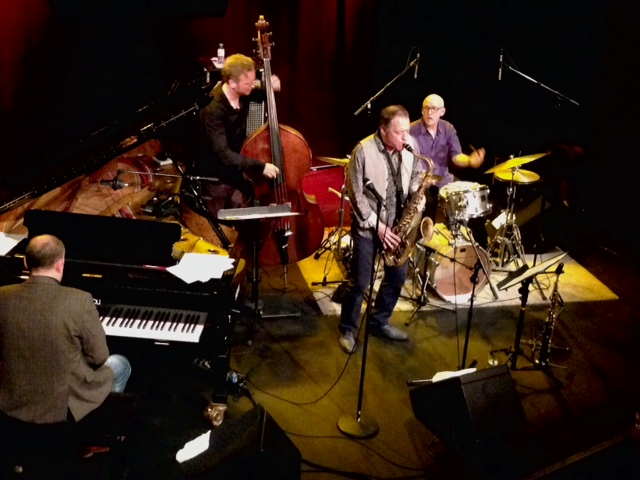
Middleton with pianist Kálmán Oláh, drummer Adam Nussbaum and bassist Morten Ramsbøl at Porgy & Bess - Vienna, Austria in 2015

== Awards and honors ==
- Outstanding Jazz Soloist, DownBeat magazine, 1987
- First Prize, Best Soloist, Best Arranger, 13th Europ' Jazz Contest, Belgium, 1991
- National Endowment for the Arts Performance Grant, 1996
- Brooklyn Arts Council performance grant, 2006
- Fund for U.S. Artists at International Festivals 2004, 2003, 1993, 1992
- New York Foundation for the Arts fiscal sponsorship, 2006 – 2009
- Chamber Music America's New Works: Creation and Presentation Grant Program/Doris Duke Jazz Ensembles Project, 2004
- Bundeskanzleramt Österreich: Film Kompositionsförderung, 2014

== Discography ==
=== As leader ===
- The Fensters - Jazz Music Vol. 1 (Arta, 1992)
- The Fensters - Jazz Music Vol. X (A Records, 1996)
- Acid Rain (Owl/Time Line, 1991)
- Terra Infirma (Owl /EMI France, 1995)
- Nomad's Notebook (Intuition,, 1999)
- Reinventing the World (Intuition, 2003)
- The Muir Woods Suite (Chamber Music America, 2006)
- The European Quartet Live (Qrious, 2007)
- Between Worlds (Prova, 2010)
- Three Hearts, Three Minds (Alessa, 2010)

=== As sideman ===
- Stefan 'Pista' Bartus Collectivity, 2012
- Lionel Hampton, Cookin' in the Kitchen Gladhamp, 1990
- Owen Howard, Drum Lore BJU, 2010
- Klemens Marktl/Flip Philip, Open Sea, ATS, 2010
- Maria Schneider, Concert in the Garden ArtistShare, 2004
- Sparkle + Andy Middleton, Playing Tricks ZeroZero Jazz, 2010
- Ron van Stratum, Swingin' in the Swamp Mons, 2010
- Piotr Wojtasik, Old Land SO Jazz, 2013
