= Howard Roberts =

American jazz guitarist (1929–1992)

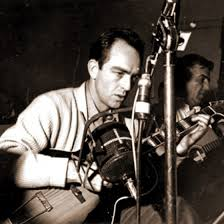
- Roberts in 1959

Background information
- Born: Howard Mancel Roberts; October 2, 1929; Phoenix, Arizona, U.S.
- Died: June 28, 1992 (aged 62) Seattle, Washington, U.S.
- Genres: Jazz, rock, country
- Occupations: Session musician, educator
- Instrument: Guitar
- Years active: 1950s–1992
- Formerly of: The Wrecking Crew

Howard Mancel Roberts (October 2, 1929 – June 28, 1992) was an American jazz guitarist, educator, and session musician.

== Early life ==
Roberts was born in Phoenix, Arizona to Damon and Vesta Roberts, and began playing guitar at the age of 8 — a Gibson manufactured $18 Kalamazoo student model acoustic given to him by his parents at Christmas. He took lessons from Horace Hatchett, who commented to Roberts' father that Roberts, at the age of 15, "... has his own style of playing and there's nothing else I can show him. He plays better than I do." By the time he was 15, he was playing professionally locally, predominantly blues-based music, where he learned from a number of black musicians, trumpeter Art Farmer being among that group. In 1992 Roberts was quoted in The Independent Newsletter by Steve Voce saying he considered that early experience to be "the most valuable" to him in his development as a player. At the time Roberts and his close friend and roommate, guitarist Howard Heitmeyer, would start their day by practicing 3 or 4 hours, catch an afternoon movie, returning to practice until they went to the clubs in the evening.

When Roberts reached the age of 17 he was involved with a class that was begun by Joseph Schillinger, a composer/theorist. Fabian Andre had been commissioned to teach the class. Some of the students who had taken the class included George Gershwin, Tommy Dorsey, Benny Goodman and Oscar Levant. Schillinger applied mathematical principles to art which appealed to Roberts. To be able to take the course he made a deal with Andre; he'd sweep the floors after class to help defray the cost of his tuition. By the late '40s Roberts was playing with one of his boyhood friends, Pete Jolly - a well known jazz pianist - and they toured Washington and Idaho in early 1950.

== 1950s ==
In 1950, he moved to Los Angeles, California arriving with no place to live and carrying only his guitar and amp. Roberts concentrated on the 'after hours' scene, jamming with such players as Sonny Stitt, Dexter Gordon and Buddy DeFranco. After hearing him play one night, Roberts met Barney Kessel which began an important and lasting friendship. It was Kessel who introduced the young Roberts to guitarist Jack Marshall who eventually signed him to Capitol Records later on in 1963.

With the assistance of Marshall, he began working with musicians, arrangers and songwriters including Neal Hefti, Henry Mancini, Bobby Troup, Chico Hamilton, George Van Eps, and Kessel. Coincidentally, Roberts' first gig was on The Al Pierce Show, a radio program which, as a 10 year old, Roberts had told his mom he'd be on someday. It was his first paying job since moving to LA, making $550 a week. It was around this time that he started teaching guitar at Westlake College.

1952 was the year Roberts played on his first record date, Jam Session No. 102 with Gerry Mulligan and Jimmy Rowles. He recorded with the Wardell Gray Quintet on the album Live at the Haig. 1953 saw him record a Troup album for Capitol Records. Following in 1955, Roberts played on the album The Chico Hamilton Trio which was released on the Pacific Jazz label. This album brought the first among other notable recognition he was to later receive, the DownBeat New Star Award.

Around 1956, Troup signed him to Verve Records as a solo artist. Kessel happened to have an A&R position at the label and produced Roberts' album entitled Mr. Roberts Plays Guitar for the label. It was this album which featured arrangements by Marshall, Marty Paich and Bill Holman - three well known arrangers in Hollywood at that time. At this point Roberts decided to concentrate on recording, both as a solo artist and a Wrecking Crew session musician, a direction he would continue until the early 1970s. One interesting story comes out of the May 1958 Peggy Lee record date he was hired for. When the session moved to record what would become one of Lee's more known hits, Fever, producer Marshall decided not to use the guitar part Roberts would have played. As a consequence, Roberts snapped his fingers on the tune along with Max Bennett's bass line and Lee's vocals. This would have technically been what session players refer to as a double, being hired to play one instrument (his guitar) and winding up playing another "instrument" - snapping his fingers.

1959 brought the opportunity to play on the background score for the TV program The Deputy, which starred Henry Fonda. Marshall did the scoring and wanted a jazz guitar to play on it. He hired Roberts for the part allowing him to improvise over the action sequences in the show.

== 1960s ==
In 1963, Roberts recorded Color Him Funky and H.R. Is a Dirty Guitar Player, his first two albums after signing with Capitol. Produced by Marshall, they both feature the same quartet with Roberts (guitar), Chuck Berghofer (bass), Earl Palmer (drums) and Paul Bryant alternating with Burkley Kendrix on organ. According to Jim Carlton writing for Vintage Guitar magazine these first two albums created a fan base that was not equaled by any other jazz guitarist at that time. After that, Roberts was referred to as simply H.R. and his albums were among the most anticipated jazz releases of the day. The albums Roberts made for Capitol were done for scale, he never received any additional remuneration on their sales. He recorded 11 albums with Capitol before signing with ABC Records/Impulse! Records.

Roberts played rhythm and lead guitar, bass guitar, and mandolin. Being frequently caught on camera with a modified '30s Gibson ES-150, known as a Charlie Christian model by collectors - and which he purchased from Herb Ellis in the '50s. This guitar was his main guitar in the early '60s through to around 1973. He was also known for his heavy use of a modified Gibson L-4 guitar in the studio and for television and movie projects. This guitar had started out as an original design in 1962 by Roberts and C.M.I. product designer and clinician Andy Nelson. The guitar had an oval sound hole and a single pickup along with other design distinctions. C.M.I., in an effort to save some money, had based what they were calling the Howard Roberts model on the slower selling L-4 which was modified after an agreement was reached between Roberts and Ted McCarty, who was then Gibson's president. The need for this agreement was due to the fact that the resulting guitar looked nothing like the design that Nelson and Roberts had submitted. Roberts called it the "best guitar I've ever owned" after taking delivery of the instrument. Unfortunately for him, both it and his Benson amp were stolen three months after he'd taken delivery on the guitar. A redesigned version was later produced by Gibson.

Between these two guitars, and a few others that Roberts used, his playing can be heard as the lead guitar on the theme from The Twilight Zone as well as acoustic and electric guitar on I Love Lucy, The Munsters, Bonanza, The Brady Bunch, Gilligan's Island, Green Acres, Get Smart, Batman, Beverly Hillbillies, Andy Griffith, Peter Gunn, Lost in Space, Dragnet, The Wild Wild West, Mission: Impossible, The Odd Couple, Dick Van Dyke, I Dream of Jeannie, and the theme for the film Bullitt. He recorded with Georgie Auld, Peggy Lee, Eddie Cochran, Jody Reynolds, Shelley Fabares, Dean Martin, the Monkees, Roy Clark, Chet Atkins, Jimmy Smith, Elvis Presley, The Beach Boys and the Electric Prunes.

As a member of the Wrecking Crew, Roberts was a part of Phil Spector's Wall of Sound, playing guitar on some of the most famous songs in pop music history. He did not get along well with Spector, as evidenced by his walking out on a session where Spector had fired his pistol into the ceiling, telling Spector to not call him again. Hal Blaine noted in Denny Tedesco's documentary, The Wrecking Crew, that Roberts was the only person he had ever seen walk out on a date. From the 1960s through to around 1976 it's estimated he played on more than 2000 records and would routinely log more than 900 sessions a year for a time.

Roberts along with one of his former students, Ron Benson, was involved in building guitar amplifiers in 1968 through 1970. Due to the different styles Roberts was playing he was in need of an amp that was versatile enough to cover the different genres. Benson, using the Gibson GA-50 as inspiration, told Roberts he was going to build him an amp that would meet his requirements. Roberts responded by fronting him the funds to build one for each of them. After hearing the amp known as the Benson 300 at sessions, other players became interested in acquiring a Benson amp. The pair built around 2000 amps before some issues with investors brought a close to Benson Electronics, Inc. as a company.

== Later work ==
From the late 1960s, Roberts began to focus on teaching rather than recording. He traveled around the country giving guitar seminars, and wrote several instructional books. For some years he also wrote an acclaimed column called "Jazz Improvisation" for Guitar Player magazine. Roberts developed accelerated learning concepts and techniques, which led to the founding of Playback Music Publishing and the Guitar Institute of Technology. In 1977, he co-founded the Musicians Institute (MI) in Hollywood.

== Personal life ==
Roberts was married three times and had five children: one girl with his first wife, Betty; three boys with his second wife, Jill; one son with his last wife, Patricia. Roberts died of prostate cancer in Seattle, Washington, on June 28, 1992.

== Awards and honors ==
In 2007, Howard Roberts and other members of the Wrecking Crew were inducted into the Musicians Hall of Fame and Museum in Nashville, Tennessee.

== Guitars ==
Howard Roberts' main instrument was a Gibson ES-150 purchased from Herb Ellis. He designed a guitar with C.M.I. production designer and clinician Andy Nelson in 1962. Howard Roberts worked with Epiphone and Gibson to create several signature guitars. In 1962, Howard Roberts endorsed Epiphone and later the Epiphone Howard Roberts model was introduced, this guitar being a modified Gibson L-4 based loosely on the design submitted by Roberts and Nelson. It was a 16" wide hollow body guitar with a Gibson humbucking bridge pickup and an oval sound hole in the center of the body. In 1969 the model was rebranded as a Gibson. In 1970, Gibson introduced the Howard Roberts Fusion model, an electric semi-hollow guitar. The model evolved into Howard Roberts Fusion II in 1988 and Howard Roberts Fusion III in 1991. Both models are now discontinued.

== Discography ==
=== As leader ===
- Mr. Roberts Plays Guitar (Norgran MGN-1106, 1957; reissue: Verve MGV-8192)
- Good Pickin's (Verve MGV-8305, 1959)
- This Is Howard Roberts – Color Him Funky (Capitol ST-1887, 1963)
- H.R. Is A Dirty Guitar Player (Capitol ST-1961, 1963)
- Something's Cookin' (Capitol ST-2214, 1965)
- Goodies (Capitol ST-2400, 1965)
- Whatever's Fair! (Capitol ST-2478, 1966)
- Velvet Groove (Verve MGV-8662, 1966) compilation
- The Movin' Man (VSP/Verve VSP-29, 1966) compilation
- All-Time Great Instrumental Hits (Capitol ST-2609, 1967)
- Jaunty-Jolly! (Capitol ST-2716, 1967)
- Guilty!! (Capitol ST-2824, 1967)
- Out Of Sight (But 'In' Sound) (Capitol ST-2901, 1968)
- Spinning Wheel (Capitol ST-336, 1969)
- Antelope Freeway (Impulse AS-9207, 1971)
- Sounds (Capitol ST-11247, 1973)
- Equinox Express Elevator (ABC Impulse AS-9299, 1975)
- The Real Howard Roberts (Concord Jazz CJ-53, 1978)
- Turning To Spring (Discovery DS-812, 1980)
- The Magic Band: Live At Donte's (V.S.O.P. 94, 1995)
- The Magic Band II (V.S.O.P. 102, 1998)

=== As sideman ===
With David Axelrod

- Song of Innocence (Capitol, 1968)
- Songs of Experience (Capitol, 1969)

With Beaver & Krause

- In a Wild Sanctuary (Warner Bros., 1970)
- Gandharva (Warner Bros., 1971)
- All Good Men (Warner Bros., 1972)

With Buddy Collette

- Everybody's Buddy (Challenge, 1957)
- Jazz Loves Paris (Specialty, 1958)

With Peggy Lee

- Things Are Swingin' (Capitol, 1959)
- I Like Men! (Capitol, 1959)
- Latin ala Lee! (Capitol, 1960)
- Blues Cross Country (Capitol, 1962)
- In the Name of Love (Capitol, 1964)

With Pete Rugolo

- Introducing Pete Rugolo (Columbia, 1954)
- Adventures in Rhythm (Columbia, 1954)
- Rugolomania (Columbia, 1955)
- Music for Hi-Fi Bugs (EmArcy, 1956)
- Out on a Limb (EmArcy, 1956)
- New Sounds by Pete Rugolo (Harmony, 1957)
- Rugolo Plays Kenton (EmArcy, 1958)
- Ten Trumpets and 2 Guitars (Mercury, 1961)
- 10 Saxophones and 2 Basses (Mercury, 1961)

With Lalo Schifrin

- Gone with the Wave (Colpix, 1964)
- Cool Hand Luke (Dot, 1967)
- There's a Whole Lalo Schifrin Goin' On (Dot, 1968)
- More Mission: Impossible (Paramount, 1968)
- Mannix (Themes from the Original Score of the Paramount Television Show) (Paramount, 1968)
- Bullitt (Warner Bros., 1968)
- Kelly's Heroes (MGM, 1970)
- Rock Requiem (Verve, 1971)

With Bud Shank

- Flute 'n Oboe with Bob Cooper (Pacific Jazz, 1957)
- Blowin' Country with Bob Cooper (World Pacific, 1959)
- Windmills of Your Mind (Pacific Jazz, 1969)

With others

- Frankie Avalon, And Now About Mr. Avalon (Chancellor, 1961)
- The Beach Boys, Summer Days (And Summer Nights!!) (Capitol, 1965)
- Harry Belafonte, Belafonte Sings the Blues (RCA Victor, 1959)
- Tony Bennett, Tony Makes It Happen (Columbia, 1967)
- June Christy, Something Cool (Capitol Records, 1954)
- Roy Clark, Stringing Along with the Blues (Capitol, 1966)
- Rosemary Clooney, Rosie Swings Softly (Verve Records, 1960)
- Sam Cooke, Ain't That Good News (RCA Victor, 1964)
- Bobby Darin, Winners (Atco, 1964)
- Bobby Darin, Bobby Darin Sings The Shadow of Your Smile (Atlantic, 1966)
- The Electric Prunes, Release of an Oath (Reprise Records, 1968)
- The Four Freshmen, The Four Freshmen and Five Guitars (Capitol, 1959)
- Terry Garthwaite, Terry (Arista, 1975)
- Lorne Greene, Welcome to the Ponderosa (RCA, 1964)
- Chico Hamilton, Chico Hamilton Trio (Pacific Jazz, 1956)
- Johnny Hartman, I Love Everybody (ABC, 1967)
- John Lee Hooker, Free Beer and Chicken (ABC Records, 1974)
- Lena Horne, Stormy Weather (RCA Victor, 1957)
- Milt Jackson, Memphis Jackson (Impulse!, 1969)
- Joni James, After Hours (MGM, 1962)
- Plas Johnson, This Must Be the Plas (Capitol, 1959)
- Hank Jones, Just for Fun (Galaxy, 1977)
- Jean King, Sings for the In-Crowd (Hanna-Barbera, 1966)
- John Klemmer, Constant Throb (Impulse!, 1971)
- Charles Kynard, Where It's At! (Pacific Jazz, 1963)
- Harvey Mandel, Righteous (Phillips, 1969)
- Herbie Mann, The Magic Flute of Herbie Mann (Verve, 1957)
- Bette Midler, Broken Blossom (Atlantic Records, 1977)
- Thelonious Monk, Monk's Blues (Columbia, 1968)
- Frank Morgan, Frank Morgan (Gene Norman Presents, 1955)
- Harry Nilsson, Harry (RCA Victor, 1969)
- Frankie Randall, Going The Frankie Randall Way! (RCA Victor, 1966)
- Della Reese, Della on Strings of Blue (ABC, 1967)
- Della Reese, I Gotta Be Me...This Trip Out (ABC, 1968)
- Shorty Rogers, Chances Are It Swings (RCA Victor, 1958)
- Diane Schuur, Deedles (GRP, 1984)
- Nancy Sinatra, Sugar (Reprise Records, 1966)
- Sonny & Cher, Look at Us (Atco Records, 1965)
- The Sugar Shoppe, The Sugar Shoppe (Now Sounds, 1968)
- Gábor Szabó, Wind, Sky and Diamonds (Impulse!, 1967)
- Mel Tormé, Right Now! (Columbia, 1966)
- Bobby Troup, Bobby Troup (Capitol, 1953)
- Larry Williams, Dizzy, Miss Lizzy (Specialty, 1958)

== Bibliography ==
- Roberts, Howard; Almeida, Laurindo; Heitmeyer, Howard; Hendrickson, Al; Kessel, Barney; Pitman, Bill; Bain, Bob; Marshall, Jack (1961). West Coast Guitar: Eight Original Solos for Guitar. New York: Leeds Music Corporation. ASIN B0080YPG16. OCLC 79391800.
- Roberts, Howard; Stewart, James (1971). The Howard Roberts Guitar Book. Cherry Lane Music. ISBN 978-0899150000.
- Roberts, Howard (1972). Howard Roberts Guitar Manual Chord Melody. Cherry Lane Music. ISBN 978-0899150024.
- Roberts, Howard; Grebb, Bob (1972). Howard Roberts Guitar Manual: Sight Reading. Playback Music Publishing Company. ISBN 978-0899150031.
- Roberts, Howard; Hagberg, Garry L. (1989). The Praxis System Guitar Compendium. Advance Music. ISBN 978-3892210191.
