= Edwards Center Inc. =

US nonprofit organization

- Formation: 1972
- Founder: Dr. Jean Edwards
- Headquarters: Oregon
- Website: www.edwardscenter.org

Edwards Center Inc. (founded 1972 in Oregon by author Dr. Jean Edwards), is a private, nonprofit organization serving adult Oregonians with developmental disabilities with 20 locations in both Washington County and Clackamas Counties.

== History ==
1972 – Jean Edwards, a University of Oregon graduate with an interest in special education, founded the Edwards Center and made a promise to six families that the center would take care of their children once the parents were gone.

1975 – Oregon passed legislation allowing developmentally disabled children access to public schooling—the Individuals with Disabilities Education Act. Dr. Jean Edwards opened the first group home in Washington County housing disabled adults in the community.

2012 – Edwards Center provided resources, homes, jobs, and recreation for over 300 Oregonians with disabilities.

2013 – According to the Oregon Department of Human Services' Seniors and People With Disabilities, the number of people with developmental disabilities receiving in-home services had climbed from just under 2,000 to 9,000 between 2001 and 2010. Allen Cress, (executive leader of Edwards Center Inc.), began a building project at the Edwards Community Center in Beaverton, Oregon, a planned neighborhood of ten homes. The facility provides families a community, allowing parents to live along side their children—then takes over permanent care of the children, with caregivers available on an as-needed basis, often costing less than an in-home care provider, according to the Lund Report.

2014 – The "Tree of Life" campaign began for the Edwards Center and included the Tree of Life benefit concert series, held twice a year at the Edwards Aloha Community Center, as well as recordings and music videos which documented stories of adults overcoming the challenges associated with developmental disabilities. Performers at the live concert series have included Oregon musicians and artists such as Esperanza Spalding, Gino Vannelli, Tom Grant, Oregon Poet Laureate Paulann Petersen, Janet Chvatal and Marc Gremm. The series is sponsored by the Fournier Insurance Group.

2015 – Two homes were completed at the Community Center in Beaverton. Edwards Center Inc. established a partnership with Meals on Wheels and Washington County Disabled, Aging, and Veteran's Services to serve lunches to seniors and veterans, which according to the Portland Tribune, "provide new community connections for several groups that might otherwise become isolated."

== See also ==
- Independent living
- Timeline of disability rights in the United States
- Janet Chvatal
- Meals on Wheels

== Sources ==
- Edwards, Jean Parker. We are people first, our handicaps are secondary. Foreword by Robert Perse. Photography by John Stewart. Portland, Or. Ednick, c1982. 90 pages. Dewey 362.4/06/01.
- Edwards, Jean Parker. Sara and Allen: the right to choose. 2nd Edition. Portland, Or. Ednick, c1976. 85 pages. Dewey 362.386.
