= John Gross (musician) =

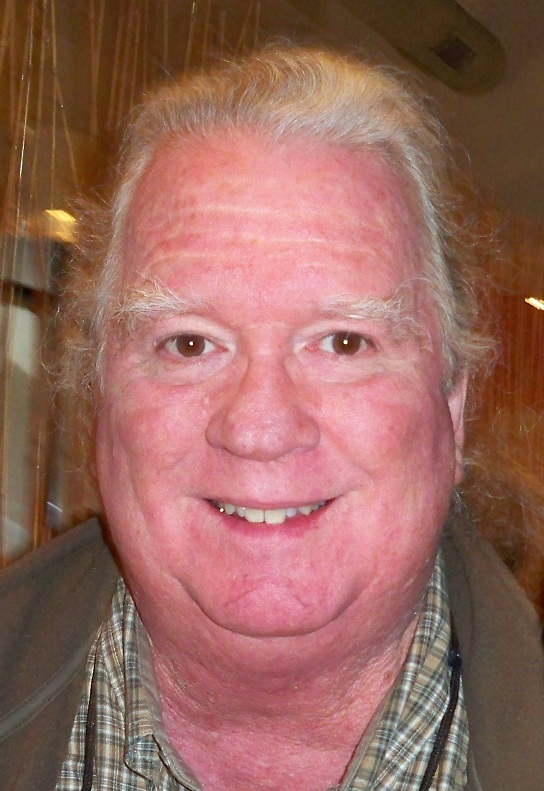

Background information
- Born: John Curtis Gross; May 30, 1944; Burbank, California, United States
- Genres: Jazz
- Occupations: Musician, producer
- Instruments: Tenor sax, clarinet, flute
- Years active: 1958 – present

John Gross (né John Curtis Gross; born on May 30, 1944, in Burbank, California) is an American saxophone, flute and clarinet player. He is the creator of a notational method called Multiphonics for the Saxophone.

== Early career ==
Raised in a musical family, he launched his professional career at age of 8 in Los Angeles, playing clarinet for the L.A. County Parks and Recreation Youth Orchestra. Gross studied clarinet with Phil Sobel and Vito Susca, and saxophone with Ronnie Lang and John Graas. As a child and youth Gross played in the Burbank Youth Symphony, All-Southern California Junior High School Orchestra, American Youth Symphony, L.A. All-City High School Band, I.O.F. Robin Hood Youth Band, and Sepulveda Youth Band.

At age 14, Gross was playing at the Gas House in Venice Beach, the epicenter of L.A. Beat culture (which led to a police visit, and the threat of juvenile detention for John and his date). John earned his jazz improv chops in L.A.'s jazz scene playing at venues such as the Hillcrest Club on Washington Boulevard with jazz greats such as Ornette Coleman, Don Cherry, Gary Peacock, and Horace Tapscott, who were participants of the scene at the time, and the shapers of L.A. jazz.

At age 16, Gross dropped out of the California State University, Northridge, and hit the road with Harry James. The band was playing on a bill with the famous crooner Billy Eckstine ("My Foolish Heart").

Gross continued to work in top-level bands in the early '60s, touring with Lionel Hampton, Johnny Mathis, Stan Kenton, and Woody Herman.

In the mid-60s, Gross was playing at the Lighthouse Café in Hermosa Beach with regulars Warne Marsh, Lou Ciotti, Frank Strazzeri, Putter Smith, Dave Parlato, Abe and Sam Most, Jimmy Zito, Hart Smith, Sal Nistico, Frank De La Rossa and Dave Koonse.

== Later career ==
Gross spent five years (1967–1972) as house band member at Shelly Manne's Hollywood club, "Shelly's Manne-Hole," playing opposite such jazz greats as Miles Davis, John Coltrane, Sonny Rollins, Bill Evans, Thelonious Monk, Art Blakey, Abbey Lincoln, Muddy Waters, Gary Barone, Mike Wofford, and Dave Parlato. He toured Europe with Manne in 1970 playing on "Alive in London", recorded during a fondly remembered residency at Ronnie Scott's Jazz Club in London.

Gross spent four years (1979–1983) touring worldwide with Toshiko Akiyoshi's big band, including a gig at Carnegie Hall. The Toshiko Akiyoshi – Lew Tabackin Big Band was known for its wild "tenor battles" between Gross and Toshiko's husband Lew Tabackin.

Among the countless other musicians Gross has played, toured and/or recorded with are Earl Grant, Oliver Nelson, Don Ellis, Gerald Wilson, Bill Holman, Alan Jones Sextet, Piotr Wojtasik, and Gordon Lee.

He has also performed with Rosemary Clooney, Nancy King, Diana Krall, Freddie Hubbard, Larry Young, Donald Bailey, Drew Gress, Dave Holland, Cubby O'Brien, Russ Morgan, Kay Kyser, Lennon Sisters, Roger Williams, Ernie Andrews, Gladys Knight, Stevie Wonder, Brad Turner, Carole King, Belinda Underwood, Glen Moore, Gary Versace, Israel Annoh, Pat Coleman, Alain Jean-Marie, The Hitchens Consort, Larry Koonse, The Belmondo Brothers, and Francois Theberge.

Gross received a preliminary Grammy nomination (best jazz album and best jazz soloist) for his 1990 trio album Three Play with bassist Putter Smith and guitarist Larry Koonse. He moved to Portland, Oregon, in 1991.

== Reception ==
Gross is known as a musician's musician, a mainstay, and in 1994, Saxophone Journal called him one of the most meaningful players on the American jazz scene.

== Awards ==
- Winner, Alto Sax Soloist, Lighthouse International Jazz Festival, 1958
- Winner, Alto Sax Soloist, Long Beach Jazz Festival, 1958

== Discography ==
=== As leader ===
- John Gross Quartet, Caution (Vee-Jay, 1975)
- John Gross Trio, Threeplay (1989)
- John Gross and Billy Mintz, Beautiful You (2004)
- John Gross Trio with Dave Frishberg, Strange Feeling (2006)

=== As sideman ===
With Shelly Manne

- Outside (Contemporary, 1969)
- Alive in London (Contemporary, 1970)
- Mannekind (Mainstream, 1972)

With the Putter Smith Quintet

- Lost and Found, 1977
- Nightsong, 1995

With the Toshiko Akiyoshi – Lew Tabackin Big Band

- Farewell (Victor, 1980)
- From Toshiko with Love (Victor, 1981)
- European Memoirs (Victor, 1982)

With others

- Oliver Nelson Orchestra, Black, Brown and Beautiful, (Flying Dutchman, 1969)
- Kim Richmond Ensemble, Looking In, Looking Out, 1983
- Kim Richmond Concert Jazz Orchestra, Passages, 1992
- William Thomas, Notes from a Drummer, 1991
- Jeff Johnson, My Heart, 1991
- Pat Coleman/Bob Murphy Quartet, Come Rain or Come Shine, 1996
- Gordon Lee Quartet, Rough Jazz, 1997
- Howard Roberts, Magic Band, (1968), 1998
- Tom Wakeling/Brad Turner Quartet,Live at the Cotton Club, 1998
- Alan Jones Sextet, Unsafe, 1999
- Alan Jones Sextet, Leroy Vinnegar Suite, (2001)
- Karen Hammack/Paul Kreibich Quartet, Lonesome Tree 2004
- Belinda Underwood, Uncurling, 2005
- David Friesen, Four to Go, 1992
- David Friesen, Five and Three, 2006
- David Friesen, Circle of Three, 2010

== Publications ==
- Gross John (1999), Multiphonics for the Saxophone: A Practical Guide; 178 Different Note Combinations Diagrammed and Explained, Advance Music. OCLC 475411398
