= Mike Wofford at Maybeck =

Live album by Mike Wofford
- Recorded: September 1991
- Venue: Maybeck Recital Hall, Berkeley, California
- Genre: Jazz
- Label: Concord

Mike Wofford at Maybeck: Maybeck Recital Hall Series Volume Eighteen is an album of solo performances by jazz pianist Mike Wofford.

== Music and recording ==
The album was recorded at the Maybeck Recital Hall in Berkeley, California in September 1991. "Wofford's choice of material leans a bit off the trail of the usual standards now and then, with an emphasis on jazz tunes like Ray Bryant's 'Tonk' and 'Topsy', as well as the dignified 'Impresiones Intimas No. 1' by Spanish classical composer Federico Mompou."

== Release and reception ==
Professional ratings
Review scores
Source	Rating
AllMusic	3/5 stars
The Penguin Guide to Jazz	3/4 stars

The AllMusic reviewer described it as "A decent entry in the Maybeck series, if not among the best." The Penguin Guide to Jazz commented on the excellent sound quality of the recording and noted that "the pianist's oblique manner won't be to all tastes."

== Track listing ==
1. "Introductory Announcement"
2. "Tonk"
3. "Too Marvelous for Words"
4. "Stablemates"
5. "For Woff/One to One"
6. "Rose of the Rio Grande"
7. "Little Girl Blue"
8. "Duke's Place/Mainstem"
9. "Topsy"
10. "Impresiones Intimas No. 1"
11. "Lullaby in Rhythm"

== Personnel ==
- Mike Wofford – piano
