= Janet Chvatal =

American actress

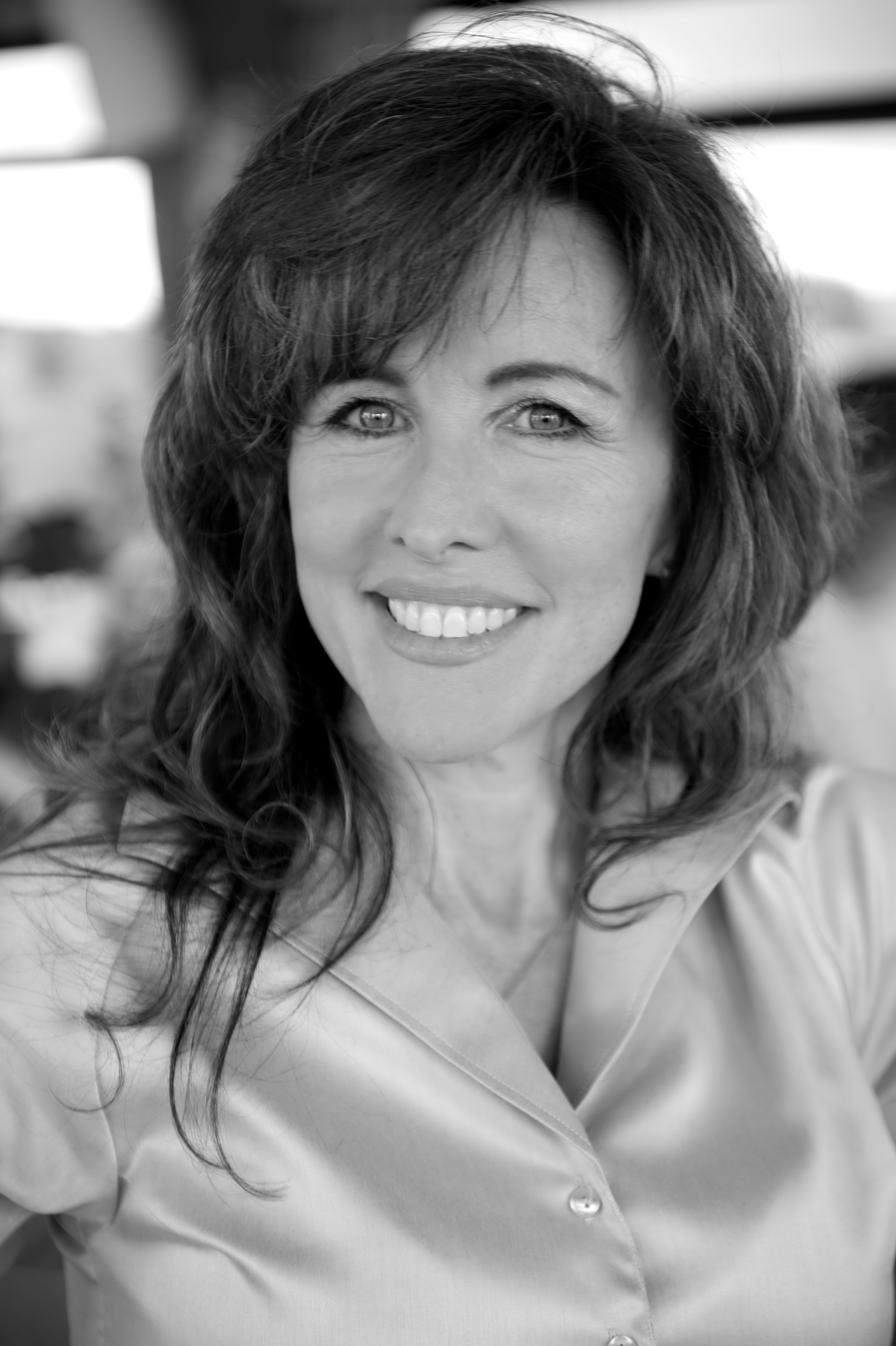
- Janet Chvatal, 2016
- Born: September 26, 1964 (age 61); Boynton Beach, Florida, U.S.
- Education: Boston University (BA)
- Occupations: classical singer, director, author
- Years active: 1984–present
- Website: www.janetandmarc.com

Janet Marie Chvatal (born September 26, 1964) is an American classical soprano and musical theatre singer, director and author, best known for her production and charity work in Germany and for her creation of the role of Empress Elisabeth of Austria in the world-premiere of the German musical Ludwig².

== Biography ==
Chvatal was born in Boynton Beach, Florida, and grew up in Beaverton, Oregon. She attended Boston University College of Fine Arts on a four-year music scholarship from 1982 to 1986, where she trained in opera and lieder under Robert Gartside and attended master classes with Leonard Bernstein and José van Dam. In 1986 she graduated from Boston University summa cum laude. In 1987, Chvatal achieved one of Rotary International's Ambassadorial Scholarships for international study abroad and attended the program for graduate studies in opera at the University of Music and Performing Arts, Vienna, along with private lessons from Carol Mayo. In 1988 and 1989 Chvatal took first place in two national vocal competitions in the U.S. and moved to Paris for a year-long apprenticeship with French coloratura soprano, Mady Mesplé.

Her professional debut came in 1984 as Louisa in the 25th anniversary of the longest running musical on Broadway, The Fantasticks. She made her European debut in Vienna as Christine Daaé in Andrew Lloyd Webber's The Phantom of the Opera from 1990 until 1992. Between 1991 and 1993, Chvatal appeared as a guest in leading roles in opera, concert and in recital in the U.S., France, England and Austria. Swedish composer Thomas Haglund composed the piece Miroirs for Chvatal in 1991, which was premiered by Chvatal at the Helsingborg Swedish Music Festival.

From 1994 until 2004 she appeared in the US, Canada and throughout Europe in duo with classical guitarist Scott Kritzer, including highlight performances at the Kennedy Center in Washington D.C. and the Festhalle Frankfurt, Germany. She appeared in gala performances with the stars of Riverdance, the Gipsy Kings and with the Cirque du Soleil.

In 2003, Chvatal was a special guest with Gino Vannelli and his orchestra at the Montreal International Jazz Festival and appeared on his CD Canto which was featured on CBC in Canada.

In 2005, for the world-premiere of the musical Ludwig^{2}, written by Rolf Rettburg, and composed by Christopher Franke, Nic Raine and Konstantin Wecker, Chvatal created the leading role of the historical empress of Austria, known as Sissi. The musical Ludwig^{2} is based on the life of Ludwig II of Bavaria and celebrated its premiere in the Musiktheater Füssen, directly across from Neuschwanstein Castle. Chvatal re-visited the role in Kempten, Germany, for the 2011 production.

== Productions and charity events ==
1998 – Chvatal's transition from performer to author and producer began with the establishment of her own music label, Miramont Records, together with Scott Kritzer and Todd Hutchinson. Between 1998 and 2004, Chvatal produced a number of concerts and CD recordings in the US and Canada. In 2004 she was engaged as production-coordinator for the world-premiere of the musical Ludwig^{2} in Germany, where she had the opportunity to work with Disney director and choreographer Sylvia Hase, Irish director Conall Morrison, and stage designer Michael Curry.

2005 – Chvatal began a campaign through southern Germany to raise her audiences' awareness of the need to support charity organizations with a series of concerts and appearances in hospitals around the region. She raised funds for initiatives such as the Children's Cancer Help and Little Smiles Sri-Lanka, and produced a gala for the 25th anniversary of Karlheinz Böhm's charity organization People for People, with guest appearances by Konstantin Wecker, Christine Kaufmann and a team of over 200 dancers, singers and musicians.

2008 – Chvatal, together with stage partner, Marc Gremm, under the name of "Janet & Marc", created numerous CD recordings and stage productions, including open-air concerts, film and opera galas and special charity events.

2009 – Chvatal began campaigning for charity causes in the US, including benefit concerts for Edwards Center Inc. and for the music program in her hometown in Portland, Oregon.

2009–2011 – Chvatal and Gremm directed a charity concert series for the Neuschwanstein Castle in Bavaria, entitled Abendmusik.

2012 – Chvatal authored the award-winning musical, Die Legende des ...liebes Rot-Flueh, based upon the myths of the Tannheim valley in the Austrian Alps. The musical was produced by Chvatal and Gremm and premiered in Tirol, Austria.

2014 – Chvatal directed a production of Stephen Sondheim's Into the Woods in England.

2016 – Chvatal and Gremm conceived and produced the world's first musical on board a ship with scenes on land. British film composer Nic Raine wrote the music. Chvatal was responsible for the Libretto. Der Schwanenprinz – Lebe deinen Traum, a "Musical Adventure Journey" was first performed on 30 July 2016 on board the MS Fuessen, directly in front of the Castle Neuschwanstein on the Forggensee in Bavaria, Germany.

2018 - After sold-out performances in 2016 and 2017, the Musical Der Schwanenprinz – Lebe deinen Traum was postponed until 2019, due to repairs to the hydro dam which feeds the lake on which the musical is performed.

2019 – Chvatal's first children's book was published in 2017 in Germany, followed by an English edition entitled The Wish Prince. To accompany the release of the 2nd edition Chvatal began a nationwide project to support families with school children grades 1 - 4, in a five-step daily activity program to reach their goals. The project is called "Let's Live Our Dreams".

2021 - Chvatal wrote, directed and produced an English version of her musical Der Schwanenprinz called The Dream King for the Festspielhaus Neuschwanstein Theater in Bavaria, Germany.

== Awards ==
- 2012 – Top of the Mountains Touristic Award for Best Event for the musical Die Legende des ...liebes Rot-Flueh
- 2012 – The Southern Cross. Bavaria, Germany
- 2001 – Paul Harris Fellowship Award for outstanding service to the community (awarded by Rotary International)

== Discography ==
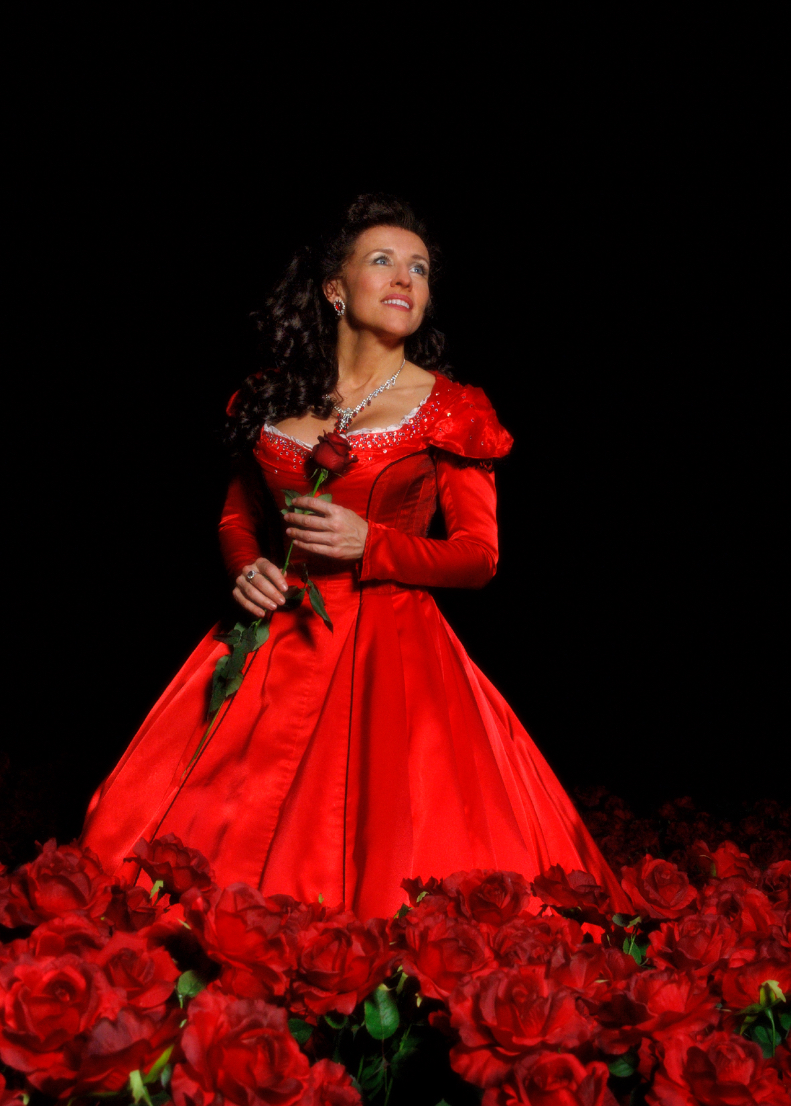
Chvatal during rehearsal for Ludwig^{2}

- 2018 Der Schwanenprinz und der Traumkristall - Suite 31 Productions
- 2016 Der Schwanenprinz - Suite 31 Productions
- 2015 Falling in Love Again - Favorite Duets – Suite 31 Productions
- 2013 Brennende Herzen – Suite 31 Productions
- 2012 Die Legende des ...liebes Rot-Flueh – Suite 31 Productions
- 2011 Antiphon – Ark Records. Coram Deo Ensemble with Janet & Marc, Jeff Johnson, Wendy Goodwin & Brian Dunning
- 2010 Bella Notte Riserva – Suite 31 Productions. Musical highlights arranged by Nic Raine. Janet & Marc with the Prague Philharmonic Orchestra
- 2010 Coram Deo Vol. 1 – SCM Hänssler/SCM Verlag. Compilation CD of music with Jeff Johnson
- 2009 Evening Star – Suite 31 Productions. Christmas carols arranged by Nic Raine. Janet & Marc with the Prague Philharmonic Orchestra
- 2008 True Love – Suite 31 Productions. Film classics arranged by Nic Raine. Janet & Marc with the Prague Philharmonic Orchestra
- 2007 Bella Notte – Suite 31 Productions. Musical highlights arranged by Nic Raine. Janet & Marc with the Prague Philharmonic Orchestra
- 2006 A Rose in December – Secret Couch Productions. Christmas CD with orchestra & children's choir. Special guests: Scott Kritzer & Gino Vannelli
- 2005 Ludwig^{2} – BMG Records. Recording for the musical production. Music by Konstantin Wecker, Christopher Franke and Nic Raine
- 2005 The Katurran Odyssey – ARK Records/Simon & Schuster Publishing. CD to the book by Terryl Whitlatch and David Wiedler
- 2004 Vespers – ARK Records. Music by Jeff Johnson
- 2004 In The Blue Hour – Miramont Records. Opera arias in new arrangements with classical guitarist Scott Kritzer and the Bavarian Radio Symphony Orchestra
- 2003 Canto – RCA Victor/Sony/BMG Records. Music by Gino Vannelli
- Columbia/Sony Music Entertainment: Oh wie verführerisch. A co-production mit ARD German television, includes live performances with the Bavarian Radio Symphony Orchestra
- Windham Hill/BMG Entertainment: Music of Celtic Legends. New Age composer and pianist Jeff Johnson, Irish flutist Brian Dunning
- Windham Hill/BMG Entertainment: Carols of Christmas II
- Miramont Records: Songs of the Americas. North and South American songs from Brasil, Haiti and Puerto-Rico, with guitarist Scott Kritzer
- Hearts of Space Records: Prayers of St. Brendan
- Ark Records: Navagatio, Vespers, Psalmus and Byzantium
- Michael Curry: Spirits, CD of the production Spirits, music by Alan Jones
- Amosaya Music: Murray’s Cadillac recordings with jazz bassist Ben Wolfe
