= Paul Mazzio =

American jazz musician

Paul Mazzio (born 1959/60) is an American jazz trumpeter, based in Portland, Oregon. A graduate of the University of North Texas and the University of Southern California Schools of Music, while a student in Texas he won 1st place in the 1982 Jazz Improvization Contest. Mazzio has performed with many artists including the Chuck Israels Orchestra, Tony Bennett, Larry Carlton, the Moody Blues etc. He traveled extensively with the Woody Herman Orchestra in the 1990s. His playing has a warm tone.
