= Aspen Mays =

American artist

Aspen Mays (born 1980) is an American artist.

== Early life and education ==
Aspen Mays was born in Asheville, North Carolina, and raised in Charleston, South Carolina. Mays received her MFA from the School of the Art Institute of Chicago.

She also studied photography in Cape Town, South Africa while volunteering in a clinic for bead working artisans living with HIV.

== Career ==
Mays's solo exhibitions include Every leaf on a tree at the Museum of Contemporary Art, Chicago; From the Offices of Scientists at the Hyde Park Art Center, Chicago; Concentrate and Ask Again at Golden Gallery, Chicago. Mays was a 2009–2010 Fulbright Fellow in Santiago, Chile, where she worked with astronomers who are using the world's most advanced telescopes to look at the sky.

During her time at the observatory, she was given access to the institutional archive of rejected prints, negatives, and other ephemera. This resulted in her body of work, "Sun Ruins," which functions as an umbrella for two distinct yet related bodies of work. In 2006, she was awarded a Rotary Ambassadorial Scholarship for study in Cape Town, South Africa. More recently, honors include a Fulbright Fellowship at the University of Chile, Santiago. She currently lives and works in Los Angeles.

The Atlanta-based Art Papers describes her work as standing "in deft opposition to the technology we have come to rely on for answers, putting faith not in complex databases and rapidly evolving technology, but rather in the ability of everyday objects and materials to spark our imagination." In doing so, she "re-imagines the world around us, finding new possibilities in the commonplace."

Mays is currently an associate professor in Graduate Fine Arts and Undergraduate Photography at California College of the Arts

== Solo exhibitions ==
- Tengallon Sunflower and California Dreaming at Higher Pictures in New York, September 15 – October 27, 2018
- Newspaper Rock at Light Work in Syracuse, New York, January 13 – March 6, 2014
- Ships that Pass in the Night at the Center for Ongoing Projects and Research (COR&P) in Columbus, OH, April 27 - June 28, 2013
- Every leaf on a tree at the Museum of Contemporary Art, Chicago, Feb 6–Feb 28, 2010

== Publications ==
- Almufti, Omar (September 2010). "Shooting Stars". Jettison Quarterly. 7: 68–75. Archived from the original on 2011-10-13.
- Aloi, Giovanni. "Water Works." Antennae: The Journal of Nature in Visual Culture , Summer 2016, Issue 36, p 81-94,
- "A Celebration of Imagination: Aspen Mays at the MCA and Hyde Park Art Center". f News Magazine. March 2010. Archived from the original on 2011-07-18.
- "Interview: Aspen Mays". Bad at Sports. February 2010.
- Smigasiewicz, Beatrice (February 2010). "Review: Aspen Mays/Hyde Park Art Center & Museum of Contemporary Art". Newcity Newspaper.
- Ritchie, Abraham (July 2009). "Waiting to Know While on the Ground". ArtSlant.
- Weinstein, Michael (June 2009). "Review: Aspen Mays/ Golden Gallery". Newcity Newspaper.
- Yood, James (November 2009) "Aspen Mays, [at] Golden." Artforum 48, no. 3: 236–237.
- Olu, Amani (May 2009). "Chicago Standout Photography". Whitewall Magazine. Archived from the original on 2009-06-23.
- Where We've Been, Where We're Going, Why?, 02/2016, Dan Boardman and Aspen Mays, Houseboat Press & Conveyor Editions
- Dodging Tools, 09/2018, Penumbra Foundation

== Awards ==
- Aperture Foundation - Paris Photo First Photobook Award Shortlist for the book Where We’ve Been, Where We’re Going, Why?, Dan Boardman and Aspen Mays, Houseboat Press & Conveyor Editions
