= John Klemmer =

American saxophonist (born 1946)

- Born: July 3, 1946 (age 80); Chicago, Illinois, U.S.
- Genres: Jazz, jazz fusion, acid jazz, crossover jazz, jazz rock
- Occupations: Musician, composer
- Instrument: Tenor saxophone
- Years active: 1963–present
- Labels: Cadet, Impulse!, ABC, Elektra

John T. Klemmer (born July 3, 1946 in Chicago, Illinois) is an American saxophonist, composer, songwriter, and arranger.

== Biography ==
Klemmer was born July 3, 1946 in Chicago, Illinois. He began playing guitar at age 5 and alto saxophone at 11. His numerous early interests included graphics and visual art, writing, dance, puppetry, painting, sculpting, and poetry. He studied at the Art Institute of Chicago and began touring with midwestern "ghost big bands" (Les Elgart, Woody Herman), as well as playing with small local jazz and rock groups. After switching to tenor saxophone in high school, Klemmer played with commercial small groups and big bands in Chicago while leading his own groups and touring.

Klemmer studied and performed music extensively during his younger days and in college. This included piano, conducting, harmony, theory, composition, arranging, clarinet, flute, and classical and jazz saxophone. He studied sax and jazz improvisation with noted Chicago saxophonist and teacher Joe Daley. He attended the National Music Camp at Interlochen. The year he graduated high school, Klemmer was signed by producer Esmond Edwards at Chess Records, eventually recording five albums with their Cadet label including his innovative 1969 hit Blowin' Gold (co-produced by ex-Rolling Stones producer Marshall Chess). This album was an early example of the fusion genre; follow-up albums introduced innovative rock rhythms, sounds and production techniques and debuted electronic effects with the saxophone that became his "trademark" delay sound.

Klemmer led his own groups touring the U.S., with Chicago sidemen such as Jodie Christian, Wilbur Campbell and Cleveland Eaton, while occasionally performing in tandem with friends such as jazz artists Eddie Harris and Oscar Brashear; arranger Les Hooper; artists such as James William Guercio (later to produce Blood, Sweat & Tears and Chicago); and various rock artists such as guitarist Harvey Mandel. Klemmer did his first PBS special for WTTW-TV Chicago. He was also a busy sideman, exploring every genre of music.

He moved to Los Angeles the following year, and for a brief time was a key soloist and arranger with Don Ellis's big band. He toured Europe and Africa with Oliver Nelson for the State Department, while working with such diverse artists as Tim Buckley and others. He studied film scoring with Albert Harris and vocal lessons with Seth Riggs. Klemmer continuously led his own small groups touring across the U.S., further developing his unique sound, style and concepts. He primarily focused on his jazz-rock fusion styles, returning briefly to more traditional jazz, switching to a more "intense" "Coltrane-ish" approach upon leaving Chess Records, and signing with and recording four albums for Impulse! Records.

He performed at the Newport and Monterey Jazz Festivals, Antibes Jazz Festival, Carnegie Hall, Tanglewood, and Montreux Jazz Festival plus TV shows the Midnight Special and Rock Concert. Klemmer has composed all songs for many of his albums, amassing a large publishing catalog, but he has also collaborated and co-written musically and as lyricist with many pop songwriters, such as David Batteau, with the UK hit "Walk In Love", recorded by The Manhattan Transfer, Danny O'Keefe, Clint Holmes, Pamela Oland, and many others. After another of his many sabbaticals, he again changed musical direction by then moving to ABC/MCA Records briefly returning to his early R&B and pop roots. Klemmer then went on to earn crossover appeal with his now landmark series of "Touch" recordings. Klemmer and the "Touch" series of recordings are regarded by many as paving the way and being "the founder" of the smooth jazz genre, some anointing him "The Ambassador of Cool".

His continuous fast changing of musical directions throughout his career reportedly created some controversy, confusion and false speculative motivational assumptions and judgments from his earlier jazz purist audience, with the now historic "Touch" series of recordings. His managerial associations with noted former Doors manager Bill Siddons and with Faith Hill, Keith Urban, and James Taylor manager Gary Borman, helped Klemmer expose his music to a growing number of pop, rock, R&B and adult contemporary audiences. He toured extensively as headliner and with "package tours" with George Benson, and Herbie Hancock plus numerous TV appearances arranged by the William Morris Agency. He expanded his musical palette to include kalimba, flutes, keyboards, percussion and solo vocal.

At this time, he further developed his innovative Solo Sax Concept resulting in the now landmark recording of Cry ushering in, thought by many, the "New Age Music Spiritual" genre, with some now calling him the "Sax God". In 1979, he briefly returned to his earlier jazz roots recording the "straight ahead jazz" 2-LP offering, Nexus – For Duo & Trio, now considered by many a classic, at personal request of Clive Davis for former Arista/Bluebird/RCA Records, followed by occasional special recording projects such as duo recordings with Joe Sample and Oscar Castro-Neves. Following another of his sabbaticals he then, upon personal urging of legendary pop and rock music mogul Joe Smith, moved to Elektra Records, recording five albums. After another brief sabbatical he then returned to Verve/GRP for Universal Records where his primary vast catalog of recordings reside. Klemmer then took his longest and most controversial sabbatical, causing numerous false rumors of personal and health problems as he continued writing, recording and working with new digital technologies, plus returning to vocal studies with noted Macy Gray and Brandi vocal teacher Roger Burnley. He then returned to recording as guest soloist with such New Age artists as 3rd Force, David Arkenstone, and Craig Chaquico, while also returning to his performing, touring and recording career.

Klemmer founded his own label, Touch Records, for "special projects & releases only" with the compact disc and digital releases of Making Love – Vol. 1, Rio – Vol. 1, and Rio – Vol. 2 as an adjunct to his major label activity such as the Verve/GRP Records release of The Very Best of John Klemmer (6024 988319 46) from 2005, including three newly recorded bonus tracks from future releases. Klemmer's music has been sampled by a large number of DJ, hip-hop, and rap artists primarily focused on his early Cadet/Chess recordings.

== Discography ==
=== As leader ===
- Involvement: The John Klemmer Quartets (Cadet, 1967)
- And We Were Lovers (Cadet, 1968)
- Blowin' Gold (Cadet Concept, 1969)
- All the Children Cried (Cadet Concept, 1969)
- Eruptions (Cadet Concept, 1970)
- Constant Throb (ABC/Impulse!, 1971)
- Waterfalls [live] (ABC/Impulse!, 1972)
- Intensity (ABC/Impulse!, 1973)
- Magic and Movement [live] (ABC/Impulse!, 1974)
- Fresh Feathers (ABC, 1974)
- Touch (ABC, 1975)
- Barefoot Ballet (ABC, 1976)
- Lifestyle (Living & Loving) (ABC, 1977)
- Arabesque (ABC, 1977)
- Solo Saxophone – Cry (ABC, 1978)
- Simpatico with Oscar Castro-Neves (JVC, 1978)
- Brazilia (ABC, 1979)
- Nexus – For Duo And Trio (Arista/Novus, 1979)
- Straight from the Heart (MCA/Nautilus, 1980)
- Magnificent Madness (Elektra, 1980)
- Hush (Elektra, 1981)
- Solo Saxophone II – Life (Elektra, 1981)
- Finesse (Elektra/Nautilus, 1981)
- Two Tone with Eddie Harris/Joe Sample/Phil Upchurch (Crusaders, 1982)
- Music (MCA, 1989)
- Making Love – Vol. 1 (Touch, 1998)
- Chateau Love (Touch, 2024)

=== As sideman ===
With Don Ellis

- Autumn (Columbia, 1968)
- The New Don Ellis Band Goes Underground (Columbia, 1969)
- Don Ellis at Fillmore (Columbia, 1970)

With others

- 3rd Force, Force Field (Higher Octave Music, 1999)
- Steve Allen, Soulful Brass #2 (Flying Dutchman, 1969)
- Ambersunshower, Walter T. Smith (Gee Street, 1997)
- David Arkenstone, Return of the Guardians (Narada, 1996)
- Beastie Boys, Ill Communication (Capitol, 1994)
- Terence Boylan, Terence Boylan (Asylum, 1977)
- David Garfield, Jammin' Outside the Box (Creatchy, 2018) includes the track "Chasing Pavements"
- Roy Haynes, Thank You Thank You (Galaxy, 1977)
- John Lee Hooker, Born in Mississippi, Raised Up in Tennessee (ABC, 1973)
- Osamu Kitajima, Masterless Samurai (Alfa, 1980)
- Gloria Lynne, I Don't Know How to Love Him (ABC/Impulse!, 1976)
- Ray Manzarek, The Whole Thing Started with Rock & Roll Now It's Out of Control (Mercury, 1974)
- Oliver Nelson, Black, Brown and Beautiful (Flying Dutchman, 1970)
- Art Pepper, Ballads by Four (Galaxy, 1981)
- Tom Scott, Foundation: The Dedication Series, Vol. XIV (Impulse!/ABC, 1978)
- Dan Siegel, Nite Ride (Inner City, 1980)
- Tom Snow, Tom Snow (Capitol, 1976)
- Steely Dan, The Royal Scam (ABC, 1976)
- Nancy Wilson, Life, Love and Harmony (Capitol, 1979) includes the track "Sunshine"
- Lauren Wood, Lauren Wood (Warner Bros., 1979)
