= Primarily Jazz =

Studio album by the Fullerton College Jazz Band
- Released: 1984 for Discovery Records, Trend AM-PM
- Recorded: Fullerton College; Fullerton, California
- Genre: Jazz, Big band, vocal, instrumental
- Length: 37:13
- Label: Discovery Records, Trend AM-PM label
- Producer: Albert Marx

The Fullerton College Jazz Band chronology
| Time Tripping (1983) | Primarily Jazz (1984) | Unforgettable (1985) |
- cat. # Trend AM-PM Records AM-13

Audio sample
- "The Bop Brothers Beach Party": file; help

Primarily Jazz is an album (LP Vinyl) released by the Fullerton College Jazz Band for the Discovery Records Trend AM-PM label, it was the third release in as many years.

== Background ==
In 1981 the Music Department at Fullerton College built a 16 track in house recording facility which was to serve as a teaching tool for both student music groups and students wanting to take recording technology classes at a vocational level. Primarily Jazz is the third of many albums to come out of this studio to feature the award-winning Fullerton College Jazz Band. The LP does contain tracks from three of the Fullerton College jazz groups: Jazz Band I, Jazz Band II, Connection Jazz Combo.

The distinctive qualities about the LP that set it apart from numerous college jazz records (what people think of as promotional demos) is the fact it was a two-year community college able to get on a label so quickly. Albert Marx, who was the owner of Discovery Records/Trend Records AM-PM label, became very impressed with the band and the level of the music coming from the jazz groups at Fullerton College. He decided to support the younger, up and coming jazz students/players from the greater Los Angeles/Southern California region by producing certain LPs.

The roster on this album is self-evident as to the diversity and level of student musicians Fullerton College developed at that time and has for many years. The track The Bop Brothers Beach Party track is also featured on the 1998 CD Celebration - The Fullerton College Jazz Festival 25th Anniversary.

== Track listing ==
All tracks are written by various artists listed.

| No. | Title | Length |
|---|---|---|
| 1. | "Licks & Tricks (Les Hooper)" | 4:14 |
| 2. | "A Shadow of Doubt (Charles Argersinger)" | 5:17 |
| 3. | "Four Play (James Linahon)" | 3:54 |
| 4. | "Shuffle This (Tom Ranier)" | 5:48 |
| 5. | "The Bop Brothers Beach Party (Matt Catingub)" | 4:51 |
| 6. | "Say It Roger (Roger Myers)" | 3:57 |
| 7. | "Why Not? (Tim Givens)" | 5:02 |
| 8. | "Morning Sun (Dan Radlauer)" | 4:13 |
| Total length: | | 37:13 |

== Recording Sessions ==
- recorded January 25–27, 1984, Fullerton College, Fullerton, California

== Personnel ==
=== Musicians ===
- Conductors: Terry Blackley and James Linahon
- Piano/tenor sax (guest soloist): Tom Ranier
- Alto sax (guest soloist): Ernie Del Fante
- Trumpet (guest soloist): James Linahon
- Trombone (guest soloist): Jeff Tower
- Drums (guest soloist): Allen Carter
- Saxes and woodwinds: Steve Alaniz, Jack Cooper, Phil Walker, Tony Morris, Edmund Velasco, Laura Nixon, Jeff Rupert, Steve Page, Luis Segovia, Russell Burt, Dan Friedman, Todd Senn
- Trumpets and flugelhorns: Phillip Wightman, Mike Schwartz, Jim Watkins, Tim Grindheim, Mark Hudson, John Aranda, Johnny Nosky, Jeff Collins
- Trombones: Roger Olsen, Wendell Kelly, Dave Abgego, Bob Heller, Dale Sanders, Dave Aul, John Gilberson, Thomas Poff, Mark Titzkowski
- Guitar: Bruce Woll, Dave Bastien
- Piano: Phill Bastanchury, Barbara Farkas
- Bass: Tim Givens, Denise Briese, Carol Chapin
- Drums: Dave Hitchings, Pat Ready, David Ramirez, Cheryl Savala

Percussion: Tim Holloway

=== Production ===
- Recording engineers: James Linahon
- Second recording engineer: Randy Beers
- Mixing engineers: Terry Blackley and James Linahon.
- Mastering: Bernie Grundman
- Pressing: L.R.S. Inc.
- Photography: Dick Rupert, John Shideler, Terry Blackley
- Liner notes: Terry Blackley
- Album design: Graham Booth, Fullerton College Art Department

== Reception ==
Professional ratings
Review scores
| Source | Rating |
|---|---|
| Jazz Journal International | very positive |
| Cadence Magazine | very positive |
| Schwann Catalogue | (listing), 1987 |
