= Unforgettable (Fullerton College Jazz Band album) =

Studio album by the Fullerton College Jazz Band
- Released: 1985
- Recorded: Fullerton College; Fullerton, California
- Genre: Jazz, Big band, vocal, instrumental
- Length: 48:43
- Label: Discovery Records; Trend AM-PM label
- Producer: Albert Marx

The Fullerton College Jazz Band chronology
Primarily Jazz (1984)	Unforgettable (1985)	Love Ya (1986/1988)
- cat. # Trend AM-PM Records AM-15

Audio sample
- "Unforgettable": file; help

Unforgettable is a CD released by the Fullerton College Jazz Bands and Jazz Singers for the Discovery Records Trend AM-PM label. The current #1 jazz band on this recording was the winner of the 1985 International Association for Jazz Education Disneyworld Competition and the opening band for the 1985 Playboy Jazz Festival.

== Background ==
In 1981 the Music Department at Fullerton College built a 16 track in house recording facility which was to serve as a teaching tool for both student music groups and students wanting to take recording technology classes at a vocational level. Unforgettable is the fourth of many albums to come out of this studio to feature the award-winning Fullerton College Jazz Band. The CD contains tracks from three of the Fullerton College jazz groups: Jazz Band I, Jazz Band II, Vocal Jazz. The recording also includes Fullerton College Jazz Band I on 3 tracks from the 1982 LP release Escape To Asylum that were re-mastered for digital release. This same year the Fullerton College Jazz Band won the Pacific Coast Collegiate Jazz Festival in May and was the Hennessey Jazz Search winner being given the honor of playing at the Playboy Jazz Festival in June.

Albert Marx, who was the owner of Discovery Records/Trend Records AM-PM label, became very impressed with the band two years earlier and the level of the music coming from the jazz groups at Fullerton College. He decided to support the younger, up and coming jazz students/players from the greater Los Angeles/Southern California region by producing certain LPs and CDs. Jazz critic Leonard Feather did the liner notes for the CD booklet of Unforgettable, "...I can only offer my congratulations on a job superbly done. In a word Unforgettable."

== Track listing ==
All tracks are written by various artists listed.

No.	Title	Length
1.	"In the Mood (Garland/Razaf, arr. Matt Catingub)"	4:04
2.	"Unforgettable (Irving Gordon, arr. Charlie Argersinger)"	4:14
3.	"But Beautiful (Van Heusen/Burke, arr. Rob McConnell)"	2:40
4.	"I Won't Dance (Jerome Kern, arr. James Linahon)"	6:00
5.	"Sweet Georgia Brown (Bernie/Pinkard/Casey, arr. Les Hooper)"	2:57
6.	"I Can't Get Started (Gershwin/Duke, arr. Tom Ranier)"	3:57
7.	"Easy Livin' (Rainger/Robin, arr. Roger Meyers)"	6:06
8.	"Someday My Price Will Come (Morey/Churchill, arr. John Karlson)"	4:45
9.	"Georgia On My Mind (Carmichael/Gorrell, arr. Dan Radlauer)"	3:27
10.	"Zip-a-Dee-Doo-Dah (Wrubel/Gilbert, arr. Dan Freidman)"	2:12
11.	"Blackley's Brow (Dan Radlauer)"	4:07
12.	"Time After Time (Cahn/Styne, arr. Matt Catingub)"	4:41
13.	"That's All (Alan Brandt/Haymes, arr. Dan Radlauer)"	1:33
Total length:		48:43

== Recording Sessions ==
- Recorded March 1–3, 1985, Fullerton College, Fullerton, California

== Personnel ==
=== Musicians ===
- Conductors: Terry Blackley and James Linahon
- Sax (guest soloist): Ernie Del Fante
- Trumpet (guest soloist): James Linahon
- Saxes and woodwinds: Steve Villa, Jack Cooper, Sarah Kibby Underwood, Harold Manning, Edmund Velasco, Dave Kraus, George Reynoso, Doug Gregan, Steve Page, Luis Segovia, Russell Burt, Yancey Valdez, Dan Freidman, Todd Senn, John Fullerton
- Trumpets and flugelhorns: John Deemer, Phillip Wightman, Mike Schwartz, Tim Grindheim, Steve Mattox, Rick Jacobsen, Mark New, Brett Pallet, Jon Aranda, Dave Brown, Tom Cameron, Mark Hough, Mark Hudson
- Trombones: Tim Hoff, Tom Griffith, Wendell Kelly, Bob Heller, Pat Aranda, Rick Acosta, Bruce Lansford, Brent Touminen, Frank Payan, Christine Harms, John Shideler
- Guitar: Bruce Wall, Jordan Woodruff, Dave Bastien
- Piano: John Karlson, Joe Van Gilder, Michael Levan
- Bass: Tom Nunes, Carol Chapin, Todd Kreutzer
- Drums: Kelly Small, Vince Dublino, Eugean Ermel
- Percussion: Pat Ready, Mike Sosnkowski
- Vocal Jazz: Patty Figueroa, Rhonda Voorhees, Dorraine Metzger, Sylvia Engle, Terri Peralta, Kerstin Klopsch, Mark Henson, Harlan Harris, Ed McCormick, Seth Weiss, Bruce Hart, Eric Jens

=== Production ===
- Recording, mixing, re-mixing: James Linahon, Terry Blackley, Alex Cima, Wade McDaniel, Roger Myers
- Mastering: Bernie Grundman
- Album design: Graham Booth, Fullerton College Art Department

== Reception ==
Professional ratings
Review scores
Source	Rating
Cadence Magazine	very positive
Jazz Journal International	positive
Tom Lord jazz discography	(listing), 1993
Schwann Catalogue	(listing), 1991

"...(Fullerton College) deserve(s) an A for effort on their UNFORGETTABLE album. Everything is done very well, and the arranging, especially, shows that a lot of care went into this recording..."

Bob Rusch, Cadence Magazine
