= Love Ya =

1986 studio album by the Fullerton College Jazz Band

Studio album by the Fullerton College Jazz Band
- Released: 1986 (vinyl LP); 1988 (CD)
- Recorded: Fullerton College; Fullerton, California
- Genre: Jazz, big band, vocal, instrumental
- Length: 44:02
- Label: Discovery Records; Trend AM-PM label
- Producer: Albert Marx

The Fullerton College Jazz Band chronology
Unforgettable (1985)	Love Ya (1986)	Soundtrack (1990)
- cat. # Trend AM-PM Records AMCD-17

Audio sample
- "Falling In Love With Love": file; help

Love Ya is a CD released by the Fullerton College Jazz Bands and Vocal Jazz for the Discovery Records Trend AM-PM label. It was first released as a vinyl LP in 1986 and then re-released by the label on digital CD in 1988. The #1 jazz band was the winner of the 1985 International Association for Jazz Education Disneyworld Competition and the opening band for the 1985 Playboy Jazz Festival as well as being invited to play at the 1986 N.A.J.E. conference.

== Background ==
In 1981 the Music Department at Fullerton College built a 16 track in house recording facility which was to serve as a teaching tool for both student music groups and students wanting to take recording technology classes at a vocational level. Love Ya is the fifth of several albums to come out of this studio to feature the award winning Fullerton College Jazz Band. The CD contains tracks from two of the Fullerton College jazz groups: Jazz Band I and Vocal Jazz.

Albert Marx, who was the owner of Discovery Records/Trend Records AM-PM label, became very impressed with the band three years earlier and the level of the music coming from the jazz groups at Fullerton College. He decided to support the younger, up and coming jazz students/players from the greater Los Angeles/Southern California region by producing certain LPs and CDs.

== Track listing ==
All tracks are written by various artists listed.

No.	Title	Length
1.	"Falling In Love With Love (Rodgers/Hart, arr. Matt Catingub)"	5:06
2.	"My One and Only Love (Mellin/Wood, arr. Roger Myers)"	4:24
3.	"I Love You (Cole Porter, arr. Les Hooper)"	3:20
4.	"Sunshine Of Your Love (Bruce/Brown/Clapton, arr. Mike Daigeau)"	4:50
5.	"We're In This Love Together (Murrah/Stegall, arr. Tom Ranier)"	4:25
6.	"If We Were In Love (Williams/Keith/Bergman, arr. James Linahon)"	5:42
7.	"Almost Like Being in Love (Lerner/Loewe, arr. Dan Friedman)"	3:30
8.	"Lover Man (Davis/Ramirez/Sherman, arr. Brent Pierce)"	3:05
9.	"Can't Buy Me Love (Lennon/McCartney, arr. Dan Radlauer)"	3:15
10.	"Goodnight My Love (Motolo/Belvin/Marascalco, arr. Charles Argersinger)"	6:25
Total length:		44:02

== Recording sessions ==
- Recorded February 13–15, 1986, Fullerton College, Fullerton, California

== Personnel ==
=== Musicians ===
- Conductors: James Linahon and Brent Pierce
- Sax (guest soloist): Ernie Del Fante
- Trumpet (guest soloist): James Linahon
- Piano (guest soloist): Tom Ranier
- Oboe (guest soloist): Tom Shoemaker
- Drums (guest soloist): Allen Carter
- Saxes and woodwinds: Russell Burt, Yancey Valdez, Brent Vaughan, Dan Freidman, Rob Mader
- Trumpets and flugelhorns: John Aranda, Glen Colby, Chris Taylor, Dave Allen and Jeff Archuleta
- Trombones: Richard Acosta, Christine Harms, Alphonse Mosse III, Kurt Godel
- Guitar: Jordan Woodruff
- Piano: Brad Hurst
- Bass: Dave Carpenter
- Drums: Eugean Ermel, Steve Teipe
- Vocal Jazz: Patricia Figueroa, Dorraine Metzger, Janis Swanson, Dana Lynn Gribble, Kerstin Klopsch, Doug Eash, Mark Henson, Harlan Harris, Ed McCormick, Seth Weiss, Bruce Hart

=== Production ===
- Recording, mixing, re-mixing: James Linahon, Randy Beers, John Sirca
- Mastering: Bernie Grundman Mastering, Hollywood, CA.
- Printing: Stoughton Printing, City of Industry, CA.
- Typography: Et Cetera Graphics, Brea, CA.
- Album cover design: Mary Naretta
- Album art director: Graham Booth, Fullerton College Art Department

== Reception ==
"...the band seems to delight in numbers with a light, springy tempo such as I Love You; a neat chart to feature the talents of pianist Hirst...The Fullerton College people are, like many others, keeping the spirit of big band music alive and for that they deserve our thanks..."

Jazz Journal International

Professional ratings
Review scores
Source	Rating
Cadence Magazine	very positive
Jazz Journal International	positive
Tom Lord jazz discography	(listing) 1993
Schwann Catalogue	(listing) 1989
