= Piranha (album) =

2000 studio album by the Fullerton College Jazz Band

Studio album by the Fullerton College Jazz Band
- Released: April 11, 2000
- Recorded: Fullerton College; Fullerton, California
- Genre: Jazz, Big band, instrumental
- Length: 1:02:06
- Label: The Orchard; ASIN: B00004TD3D
- Producer: Greg Woll

The Fullerton College Jazz Band chronology
Celebration! (1997)	Piranha (2000)	Standard Deviations (2003)
- cat. #5503, UPC: 669910550328

Piranha is a CD released by the Fullerton College Jazz Band and Alternative Jazz Lab Ensemble in 2000, it was critically acclaimed by All About Jazz.

== Background ==
In 1981 the Music Department at Fullerton College built a 16 track in house recording facility which was to serve as a teaching tool for both student music groups and students wanting to take recording technology classes at a vocational level. By 1999, when the CD Piranha was produced, there has been several award winning recordings such as Time Tripping coming from the Fullerton College Jazz Band. The group has been the recipient of numerous Down Beat and NARAS awards and the CDs are distributed worldwide.

During this time period the group was selected as the winner for the first ten-day Disney World/International Association for Jazz Education competition for College and University bands; the Fullerton College Jazz Band #1 performed at Disney World in Orlando during the inaugural concerts. After a two-week tour for the U.S. State Department, they opened the 1995 Munich International Jazz Festival.

== Track listing ==
All tracks are written by various artists listed.

No.	Title	Length
1.	"Bar Talk (Dan Radlauer)"	3:34
2.	"Bop Brothers' Latin Vacation (Matt Cattingub)"	3:54
3.	"Baby Weezer (Daniel Barry)"	5:28
4.	"L.A. Groove (James Linahon)"	4:14
5.	"From There to Here (Chuck Archard)"	5:18
6.	"Prelude to Long Time Comin' (Jeff Hawley)"	1:45
7.	"Long Time Comin' (Matt Harris)"	6:46
8.	"Lemon Street Rag (Les Hooper)"	6:25
9.	"Budini (Monk Montgomery)"	3:28
10.	"Final Dance (Dave Caffey)"	6:18
11.	"Practice on Your Own Time (Chuck Archard)"	3:15
12.	"Uranus (Walter Davis Jr.)"	4:47
13.	"Prelude to Pirnaha (Eugene Huang)"	1:27
14.	"Piranha (Dale Devoe, arr. Greg Woll)"	5:28
Total length:		1:02:06

== Recording Sessions ==
- recorded 1999 in studio, Fullerton College, Fullerton, California

== Reception ==
Professional ratings
Review scores
Source	Rating
All About Jazz	Very Good

"Saying a piranha is combative is somewhat like observing that the late Vince Lombardi was rather fond of winning. The newest release by Fullerton College’s Jazz Ensemble 1 and Alternative Jazz Lab Ensemble is exceedingly well–named, as both groups are ready to rumble from the outset and breathe fire throughout a galvanizing session comprised entirely of original compositions..."

Jack Bowers, All About Jazz
