= Edwin Knox =

American water polo player (1914–2004)

- Knox, age 34 at 1948 Olympics

Personal information
- Full name: Edwin Bruce Knox
- Born: July 24, 1914 Arapahoe, Colorado, U.S.
- Died: January 19, 2004 (aged 89) Longview, Washington, U.S.
- Spouse: Lucille Haymore (m. 1936)

Sport
- Sport: Water polo, forward sprint freestyle relays
- College team: Long Beach City College; UCLA
- Club: Los Angeles Athletic Club
- Coached by: Don Park, (UCLA); Austin Clapp, (48 Olympics)

Edwin Bruce Knox (July 24, 1914 – January 19, 2004) was an American water polo player for Long Beach City College and UCLA, who competed with the U.S. team in Water Polo at the 1948 Olympics in London. He later served in the lumber business in Oregon and as a lumber business executive for Hemphill-O'Neil in Chehalis, Washington.

== Early life and education ==
Knox was born in Arapahoe, Colorado on July 24, 1914, to Robert Bruce and Ina Weeks Knox, though several sources list his birthplace as Denver, where he may have spent his early years. The family moved West and he attended Southern California's Long Beach Poly High School, where he began his swimming and water polo career. He played water polo during his high school years, and competed in swim meets for Long Beach Poly, placing first and setting a record time in a freestyle relay foursome that helped win the Southern California Swim Championship at Long Beach Poly's home pool in June, 1931. Knox's Poly High School Swimming team, coached by Wallace L. Detrick, won the Coast League and the Southern California Championships, and were recognized as U.S. Champions in January 1933 with three swimmers announced as All Americans.

== College athletics ==
After graduating Long Beach Poly High around June 1932, he attended Long Beach City College where he was a letterman and captained the water polo team in 1933.

Knox completed his education and played water polo for the University of California at Los Angeles under Coach Don Park, where he served as Captain, and led the team to Pacific Coast Conference (PCC) titles in successive years from 1934–36. At UCLA in 1935–36, he was recognized as a part of the Pacific Coast All-conference team. He graduated UCLA with a degree in Business Management and made the Phi Beta Kappa honorary for academic achievement. In December, 1936 he played polo with several former UCLA team members, forming a team known as the California Collegiates and competed against Fullerton Junior College, an outstanding team that included future 1948 Olympic Water Polo team mate Devere Christensen, and was coached by Hall of Fame Water Polo Coach James R. Smith.

== Los Angeles Athletic Club Polo ==
Qualifying but unable to compete in the 1936 Olympics he continued to play water polo after graduating UCLA in 1936. In December, 1937, by scoring a goal as right forward Knox helped the Los Angeles Athletic Club Water Polo Team win the Athletic Club Championship of California in an 11–5 victory against a rival San Francisco Olympic Club. From 1937–48, he continued to train and play water polo for the Los Angeles Athletic Club (LAAC), which had a highly competitive program, winning AAU championship titles in 1941 and 1947–48. At a high point in his athletic career, at the 1947 National AAU Water Polo Championship in Detroit, Knox scored five goals, to lead the LAAC Water Poloists to a decisive 15–2 victory against the Illinois Athletic Club.

=== Olympics ===
Knox qualified for the 1936 Berlin Olympics by his performance at the U.S. trials in Chicago, where he competed with a group UCLA Water Poloists, but was unable to attend due to an injury during a practice game.

== 1948 London ==
Playing at right forward for the Los Angeles Athletic Club, Knox won a qualifying final Olympic trial game for the 1948 games defeating the Illinois Athletic Club 9–2 in St. Louis on July 12, 1948. Playing with Knox were fellow Southern Californian water polo players right forward Bob Bray, and left forward Devere Christensen.

Serving as Captain, he competed for the U.S. Water Polo team in the men's tournament at the 1948 London Olympics, placing ninth in the competition. The U.S. Olympic water polo team was coached by Hall of Fame Coach Austin Clapp.

== Later life and death ==
In later life, Knox worked for Western Pipe and Steel in Los Angeles. After a move to Oswego, Oregon, he worked in the lumber business, and after a transfer he worked as a Vice-President and a General Manager of Hemphill-O'Neil in Chehalis, Washington. He lived in the Longview, Washington area from 1965.

Knox died at a hospice care center in Longview, Washington, on January 19, 2004, at the age of 89. From March 26, 1936 he had been married to Lucille Haymore, whom he met in Long Beach, and married in Glendale, California. He was buried at Longview Memorial Park, where his life was later buried in 2016. They had children and grandchildren.

== Honors ==
In 1983, he was inducted into the USA Water Polo Hall of Fame.
