= Soundtrack (Fullerton College Jazz Band album) =

Studio album by the Fullerton College Jazz Band
- Released: 1990
- Recorded: Fullerton College; Fullerton, California
- Genre: Jazz, Big band, vocal, instrumental
- Length: 47:18
- Label: Discovery Records; Trend AM-PM label
- Producer: Albert Marx

The Fullerton College Jazz Band chronology
Love Ya (1986/1988)	Soundtrack (1990)	Mainstream (1994)
- cat. # Trend AM-PM Records AMCD-304

Audio sample
- "Maria": file; help

Soundtrack is a CD released by the Fullerton College Jazz Bands and Vocal Jazz for the Discovery Records Trend AM-PM label.

== Background ==
In 1981 the Music Department at Fullerton College built a 16 track in house recording facility which was to serve as a teaching tool for both student music groups and students wanting to take recording technology classes at a vocational level. Soundtrack is the sixth of several albums to come out of this studio to feature the award-winning Fullerton College Jazz Band. The CD contains tracks from two of the Fullerton College jazz groups: Jazz Band I and Vocal Jazz. The #1 jazz band was the winner of the 1985 International Association for Jazz Education Disneyworld Competition and the opening band for the 1985 Playboy Jazz Festival and the LP/CD recordings to date are recipients of numerous Down Beat and NARAS Awards.

Albert Marx, who was the owner of Discovery Records/Trend Records AM-PM label, became very impressed with the band four years earlier and the level of the music coming from the jazz groups at Fullerton College. He decided to support the younger, up and coming jazz students/players from the greater Los Angeles/Southern California region by producing certain LPs and CDs.

== Track listing ==
All tracks are written by various artists listed.

No.	Title	Length
1.	"Oh, Lady Be Good (George Gershwin, arr. Allen Carter)"	3:05
2.	"Somewhere Out There (James Horner/Barry Mann, arr. Dan Friedman)"	4:57
3.	"Maria (Leonard Bernstein, arr. David Metzger)"	4:26
4.	"When You Wish Upon A Star (Harline/Washington, arr. Charles Argersinger)"	4:37
5.	"Emily (Mandel/Mercer, arr. Les Hooper)"	4:54
6.	"Swinging On A Star (Van Heusen/Burke, arr. Matt Catingub)"	3:22
7.	"It Might As Well Be Spring (Rodgers/Hammerstein)"	5:45
8.	"Close Enough For Love (Mandel/Williams, arr. Rick Helzer)"	6:44
9.	"Invitation (Kaper, arr. Tom Hynes)"	4:54
10.	"Till There Was You (Meredith Willson, arr. Roger Myers)"	4:34
Total length:		47:18

== Recording Sessions ==
- Recorded January 1987 and 1988 Fullerton College, Fullerton, California

== Personnel ==
=== Musicians ===
- Conductors: James Linahon and Brent Pierce
- Sax (guest soloists): Ernie Del Fante, Lanny Morgan
- Trumpet (guest soloist): James Linahon
- Vocal (guest soloist): Sunny Wilkenson
- Piano (guest soloists): Rick Helzer, Tom Ranier
- Guitar (guest soloists): Tom Hynes, Adrian Rosen
- Drums (guest soloist): Allen Carter
- Saxes and woodwinds: Tuan Vu, Yancey Valdez, Dino Soldo, Russell Shepherd, Ed Little, Mike Thomas, Steve Slate, Rob Mader
- Trumpets and flugelhorns: Paul Pugh, David Glenday, Glen Colby, Tammy Dauba, Dave Allen
- Trombones: Ryan Anglin, Bruce Lansford, Glen Goodrich, Steve Sowicki, Alphonse Mosse III, Kurt Godel
- Guitar: John Hancock
- Piano: Shawn Whitmer
- Bass: Dave Carpenter, Tom Fowler
- Drums: Eugean Ermel, Bryan Head, Rich Arbuckle
- Vocal Jazz: Patricia Figeroa, Dorraine Metzger, Janis Swanson, Dana Lynn Gribble, Kerstin Klopsch, Doug Eash, Mark Henson, Harlan Harris, Ed McCormick, Seth Weiss, Bruce Hart

=== Production ===
- Recording, mixing, re-mixing: James Linahon, Warren Hatfield, Randy Beers, Dan Friedman
- Mastering: Robert Vosgien, CMS Digital
- Album cover design: Michele Shih
- Album art director: Graham Booth, Fullerton College Art Department

== Reception ==
"...vocal director Brent Pierce handles the FC Vocal Jazz ensemble with skill and the featured faculty vocalist Sunny Wilkenson is a soulful singer whose phrasing is slightly reminiscent of Stevie Wonder. Soundtrack is a digital recording and the engineering is top flight...Some of the student soloists who impress include David Allen, Aiphonse Mosse and John Hancock. The faculty soloists also demonstrate a firm grasp of big band soloing. The ensemble passages benefit from crisp execution and the arrangements reveal hard work and rehearsal. A blind-folded listener would probably have difficulty distinguishing between Soundtrack and the work of any number of contemporary (professional big band CDs)..."

Cadence Magazine

Professional ratings
Review scores
Source	Rating
Cadence Magazine	very positive
Jazz Journal International	positive
Tom Lord jazz discography	(listing) 1993
Schwann Catalogue	(listing) 1989
