= Escape to Asylum =

1982 album

Studio album by Fullerton College Jazz Band
- Released: 1982
- Recorded: Fullerton College, Fullerton, California
- Genre: Jazz; Big band; vocal; instrumental
- Length: 39:54
- Label: FC
- Producer: James Linahon

Fullerton College Jazz Band chronology
Both Sides Now (1978)	Escape to Asylum (1982)	Time Tripping (1983/1984)

Escape To Asylum is an album (LP Vinyl) released by the Fullerton College Jazz Band in 1982, it was the initial recording from an award winning group who become the Down Beat Magazine 1st Place Award Winner in the College Big Band Jazz category for 1983.

== Background ==
In 1981 the Music Department at Fullerton College built a 16 track in house recording facility which was to serve as a teaching tool for both student music groups and students wanting to take recording technology classes at a vocational level. Escape To Asylum is the first of many albums to come out of this studio to feature the award winning Fullerton College Jazz Band. The LP contains tracks from two of the Fullerton College jazz groups: Jazz Band I and Connection Jazz Combo. The roster on this album is self-evident as to the diversity and level of student musicians Fullerton College developed at that time and has for many years.

Tracks for this album are also on the AM~PM Records 1985 release Unforgettable and also on the 1998 CD Celebration! The Fullerton College Jazz Festival 25th Anniversary.

== Track listing ==
All tracks are written by various artists listed.

No.	Title	Length
1.	"P.D.Q. Waltz Straight (Roger Myers)"	3:35
2.	"Mandala (Charles Argersinger)"	5:36
3.	"Time After Time(Cahn/Styne, arr. Matt Catingub)"	4:41
4.	"Straight Ahead and Strive For Tongue (James Linahon)"	3:45
5.	"Argyle Smiles (Tom Ranier)"	7:20
6.	"Georgia On My Mind (Carmichael/Gorrell, arr. Dan Radlauer)"	3:27
7.	"Heas (Jeff Woodcock)"	5:43
8.	"Blackley's Brow (Dan Radlauer)"	4:07
Total length:		39:54

== Recording Sessions ==
- recorded January 28 and 29, 1982, Fullerton College, Fullerton, California

== Personnel ==
=== Musicians ===
- Conductors: Terry Blackley and James Linahon
- Trumpet (guest soloist): James Linahon
- Vocal: Darlene Reynolds
- Saxes and woodwinds: Steve Villa, Jack Cooper, Harold Manning, Dave Kraus, George Reynoso
- Trumpets and flugelhorns: John Deemer, Rick Jacobson, Mark New, Brett Pallet
- Trombones: Tim Hoff, Tommy Griffith, Tim Moynahan, Bob Heller
- Guitar: Bruce Wall
- Piano: Joe Van Gelder, Jeff Woodcock
- Bass: Tom Nunes
- Drums: Kelly Small
- Percussion: Pat Ready

=== Production ===
- Recording engineers: Alex Cima and James Linahon
- Second recording engineer: Wade McDaniel
- Mixing engineers: Alex Cima, Terry Blackley, Roger Myers, and James Linahon.
- Mastering: L.R.S. Inc.
- Photography: Tom Leonard
- Cover art: Joel Cadman
- Liner notes: Terry Blackley
