= Mainstream (Fullerton College Jazz Band album) =

1994 album by Fullerton College Jazz Band

Studio album by the Fullerton College Jazz Band
- Released: 1994
- Recorded: Fullerton College; Fullerton, California
- Genre: Jazz, big band, instrumental
- Length: 59:00
- Label: JLFC
- Producer: James Linahon

The Fullerton College Jazz Band chronology
Soundtrack (1990)	Mainstream (1994)	Celebration! (1997)

Audio sample
- "There's A Small Hotel": file; help

Audio sample
- "Stella By Starlight": file; help

Mainstream is a CD released by the Fullerton College Jazz Band in 1994, it was critically acclaimed by Down Beat Magazine being given three and a half stars.

== Background ==
In 1981 the Music Department at Fullerton College built a 16 track in house recording facility which was to serve as a teaching tool for both student music groups and students wanting to take recording technology classes at a vocational level. By 1994, when the CD Mainstream was produced, there has been several award winning recordings such as Time Tripping coming from the Fullerton College Jazz Band. The group has been the recipient of numerous Down Beat and NARAS awards and the CDs are distributed worldwide.

During this time the group was selected as the winner for the first ten-day Disney World/International Association for Jazz Education competition for College and University bands; the Fullerton College Jazz Band #1 performed at Disney World in Orlando during the inaugural concerts. After a two-week tour for the U.S. State Department, they opened the 1995 Munich International Jazz Festival.

The CD was dedicated to Rich Matteson who was a highly noted educator and musical artist; he had passed in 1993 shortly after his performances on the recording. A video recording was also made of Matteson's appearance on the CD. Two of the tracks are arranged by Fullerton College Jazz Band alum Jack Cooper.

== Track listing ==
All tracks are written by various artists listed.

No.	Title	Length
1.	"Stella by Starlight (Victor Young, arr. Matt Catingub)"	3:54
2.	"Polka Dots and Moonbeams (Jimmy Van Heusen, arr. Jack Cooper)"	5:30
3.	"There Is No Greater Love (Isham Jones, arr. Rich Matteson)"	5:02
4.	"How Long Has This Been Going On? (George Gershwin, arr. Rich Matteson)"	6:27
5.	"There's a Small Hotel (Richard Rodgers, arr. Jack Cooper)"	9:10
6.	"I Hear A Rhapsody (Dick Gasparre, arr. Don Rader)"	4:19
7.	"On The Trail (Ferde Grofé, arr. Don Rader)"	5:02
8.	"What Is A Woman? (Wes Hensel)"	5:32
9.	"Supposin' (P. Denniker, arr. Gordon Brisker)"	5:32
10.	"Roadsong (Wes Montgomery, arr. Tom Hynes)"	4:59
11.	"Altotude (Matt Catingub)"	4:07
Total length:		59:00

== Recording Sessions ==
- recorded 1990–1993 live and in studio, Fullerton College, Fullerton, California

== Personnel ==
=== Musicians ===
- Conductors: James Linahon
- Euphonium (guest soloist): Rich Matteson
- Trumpet (guest soloists): Don Rader and James Linahon
- Saxes and woodwinds: Scheila Gonzalez, Andy Ehling, Dan Boulton, Padraic McCoy, Morgan Fry, Steve Slate, David Shoop, Steve Slate, Alicia Mangan
- Trumpets and flugelhorns: John Trombetta, Al Abrahms, Jennifer Nelson, Dave Allen, Richard Morgan, Matt Estrada, Ed Medina, Greg Back, David Brown, Jennifer Belk
- Trombones: Ryan Anglin, Tony Arcaro, Matt Batezel, Jeff Stupin, Ray Rust, Jeremy Lynch, Jason McKnight, Francisco Torres, Larry Ebstein
- Guitar: Mike Scott
- Piano: Mark Lewis, John Erickson
- Bass: Trini Sanchez, Garret Graves, April Hayes
- Drums: Shawn Nourse, Isaac Sanchez, Jared Spears

=== Production ===
- Recording engineers: Trent Nelson and Scott Francisco
- Second Audio engineer: Jay Hamacek
- Mixing engineer: James Linahon
- Mastering: Robert Vosgien at CMS Digital
- Liner notes: James Linahon
- Album design: Susan Baxter

== Reception ==
Good/Very Good - "... Most of the pieces are classic American songbook material played with the command of a good studio band ..."

Down Beat Magazine

Professional ratings
Review scores
Source	Rating
Down Beat	Good/Very Good
