= Standard deviation (disambiguation) =

Standard deviation is a widely used measure of variability or diversity used in statistics and probability theory.

Standard Deviation(s) may also refer to:

- "Standard Deviation" (Everybody Loves Raymond), a 1996 television episode
- "Standard Deviation", an episode of Eerie, Indiana: The Other Dimension
- Standard Deviations (album), a 2003 album by the Fullerton College Jazz Band
- Standard Deviations (exhibition), a 2011–12 exhibition of digital typefaces at the Museum of Modern Art, New York
- Standard Deviation (record label), Ukrainian record label
