= Robert Conti =

American jazz guitarist and educator

- Born: November 21, 1945 (age 79); Philadelphia, Pennsylvania, U.S.
- Genres: Jazz
- Occupation(s): Musician, financial executive, educator
- Instrument: Guitar
- Years active: 1976–2020
- Labels: Discovery

Robert Conti (born November 21, 1945) is an American jazz guitarist and educator.

== Life and career ==
Conti was born in Philadelphia and was an autodidact, first performing locally at age fourteen and mentoring with Pat Martino.

In 1966, after four years on the road touring North America, he settled in Jacksonville, Florida. In 1970, he dropped out of the music business to work in the securities field. In 1976 he began playing jazz again, and 1979, he signed to the Los Angeles–based Discovery Records label. Conti released Latin Love Affair and a Direct To Disc recording titled Solo Guitar as his debut efforts as a leader in 1979.

In 1982 he left music again for the business world, but released another album, Laura in 1985, and in 1986 he headlined the Florida National Jazz Festival, with Jimmy McGriff and Nick Brignola as his sidemen. In mid-1988 he was offered a position under filmmaker Dino De Laurentiis in Beverly Hills, California. After a lengthy recovery from a back injury in late 1988, he was offered a position as resident jazz guitarist at the Irvine Marriott, a job he held until 1998.

Since starting his website in 2000, he has released 30 educational DVDs on jazz guitar, including pro chord melody and improvisation using his No Modes No Scales approach to teaching jazz guitar. In 2009, he released his own line of solid spruce thinline archtop jazz guitars.

== Playing style ==
Robert Conti advocates the use of a very thin plectrum (0.38mm) for playing single note improvisation, however, he uses fingerstyle when performing chord melody.

== Discography ==
=== As leader ===
- Solo Guitar (Trend, 1979)
- Latin Love Affair (Verydisco, 1979)
- Jazz Quintet (Discovery, 1981)
- Laura (Trend, 1985)
- The Living Legends (contains tracks recorded by Robert Conti and tracks recorded by Joe Pass) (Discovery, 1985)
- Comin' On Strong (Time Is, 1990)
- To the Brink! Featuring Rocco Barbato (Pinnacle, 2007)

=== As sideman ===
- Gerald Wilson, Lomelin (Discovery, 1981)
