= Devere Christensen =

American water polo player (1918–2013)

- Christensen (center) with Olympic Team 1948

Personal information
- Full name: Devere Woodrow Christensen
- Born: November 15, 1918 Hamilton, Iowa, United States
- Died: December 12, 2013 (aged 95) Orange County, California

Sport
- Country: United States
- Sport: Water polo, swimming
- Events: freestyle sprint, water polo
- Club: Los Angeles Athletic Club
- College team: Fullerton Junior College; University of California Los Angeles
- Coach: James R. Smith, Hall of Fame (Fullerton High and Jr. College); Don Park (UCLA)

Devere Woodrow "Chris" Christensen (November 15, 1918 – December 12, 2013) was an American water polo player for Fullerton Junior College and the University of California at Los Angeles, who competed for the U.S. team at the 1948 Summer Olympics in London. He would later reach the rank of Major serving as a pilot with the U.S. Marines, and serve as an executive for California based company Union Oil of California and Unigas through 1980.

== High School athletics ==
Christensen was born in Hamilton, Iowa on November 15, 1918, and later attended Southern California's Fullerton Union High School, coached by Naval Air Veteran and Water Polo Hall of Fame Coach James R. Smith. Christensen graduated Fullerton High on June 12, 1936. The Fullerton High team won the California Interscholastic Federation Swimming and Diving Championship on May 29, 1936, with Christensen winning the 100 and 440-yard freestyle and the 75-yard medley, and anchoring Fullerton High's freestyle relay. Fullerton had also won the CIF Championship in 1935 under Coach Smith.

== College era athletics ==
=== Fullerton Junior College ===
After high school he swam and played water polo for Fullerton Junior College from around 1935-6, also coached by Jim Smith, which won the Southern California Jr. College Championship in 1936 during Christensen's tenure with the team. Christensen's coach Smith at Fullerton was adept at utilizing his water polo players speed as an advantage. In 1936, Christensen was an All Southern California Jr. College honoree.

=== University of Southern California ===
He completed his studies at the University of California, Los Angeles and was a member of the school's water polo and swimming teams from 1939 through 1940, captaining the squad his Senior year, and graduating in 1940. Christensen was a 1937, 1939, and 1940 All PAC Conference honoree at UCLA, swimming under the direction of Coach Don Park. While at UCLA, the team won the Pacific Coast Conference titles in both 1937 and 1939. Christensen was a swimming champion in the 220 yard event. While in a UCLA meet against rival University of California, Christensen set a record time of 54.8 in the 100-yard freestyle in early April, 1940.

Christensen was a member of the LAAC squad that won an AAU Outdoor National title in 1941 and the 1947 National Amateur Athletic Union Water Polo Championship.

== 1948 London Olympics ==
Christensen was part of the U.S. team at the men's tournament at the 1948 Summer Olympics in London, where the U.S. team placed ninth overall. Italy won the gold medal, Hungary the silver, and the team from the Netherlands won the bronze, in a period when European teams particularly Eastern European teams usually dominated water polo. The U.S. team was composed largely of members of the Los Angeles Athletic Club, and was coached by Austin Clapp. Though the U.S. won their first game against the team from Uruguary 7-0, and then had a tie game with the strong team from Belgium that ended in a score of 4-4, they lost their critical match with Sweden in a 7-0 shutout, and were eliminated from further rounds.

=== Honors ===
In 1983, he was inducted into the USA Water Polo Hall of Fame.

== Careers ==
Enlisting around 1942, he served as a Pilot with the U.S. Marines and was a veteran of both WWII and the Korean war. He reached the rank of Major by 1957 and was a recipient of the Distinguished Flying Cross and several Air Medals. He retired from the reserves after thirty years, having earned the rank of Colonel. He served with Union Oil of California, known as UNOCAL from 1948–81, eventually acquiring a position as a Vice-President and general manager. He also worked for Unigas from 1966–81, where he worked as a budget and distribution manager. Christensen died on December 11, 2013.
