= Standard Deviations (album) =

Studio album by the Fullerton College Jazz Ensembles
- Released: July 2003
- Recorded: Fullerton College; Fullerton, California
- Genre: Jazz, Big band, instrumental
- Length: 50:54
- Label: HDCD
- Producer: Terry Blackley, Greg Woll; Bruce Babad

The Fullerton College Jazz Ensembles chronology
Piranha (2000)	Standard Deviations (2003)
- cat. HDCD 8.06.03

Audio sample
- "Moonlight in Vermont": file; help

Standard Deviations is a CD released by the Fullerton College Jazz Band in 2003; three of the school's groups are on the CD to include the #1 big band and two combos.

== Background ==
In 1982 the Music Department at Fullerton College starting regularly recording their jazz groups which was to serve as a teaching tool for both student music groups and students wanting to be involved with real hands on recording culminating in a marketable product. By 2003, when the CD Standard Deviations was produced, there has been several award-winning recordings such as Time Tripping coming from the Fullerton College Jazz Band. The group has been the recipient of numerous Down Beat and NARAS awards and the CDs are distributed worldwide

== Track listing ==
All tracks are written by various artists listed.

No.	Title	Length
1.	"In the Mood (Garland/Razaf, arr. Matt Catingub)"	3:48
2.	"Just In Time (Comden and Green, arr. Frank Mantooth)"	4:16
3.	"Dolphin Dance (Herbie Hancock)"	6:52
4.	"Fly Me To The Moon (Bart Howard, arr. Sammy Nestico)"	4:02
5.	"Summertime (George Gershwin, arr. Sean Emch)"	6:15
6.	"My Funny Valentine (Rodgers/Hart, arr. Emily Nafus)"	2:21
7.	"Moonlight In Vermont (Blackburn/Suessdorf, arr. Jack Cooper)"	4:46
8.	"Night and Day (Cole Porter. arr. Joe Alfuso)"	3:55
9.	"Angel Eyes (Matt Dennis)"	4:43
10.	"Softly, as in a Morning Sunrise (Romberg/Hammerstein)"	4:45
11.	"Cherokee (Ray Noble, arr. Matt Harris)"	5:09
Total length:		50:54

== Recording Sessions ==
- Recorded at Studio City Sound, July 2003

== Personnel ==
=== Musicians ===
- Conductors: Greg Woll and Bruce Babad
- Violin: Tyler Emerson
- Saxes and woodwinds: Steve Tite, Christian Hernandez, Erick MacIntyre, Kevin Oess, Collin Watson
- Trumpets and flugelhorns: Joe Harris, Anthony Kronfle, Juan Hidalgo, Devin Bohart, Monika Mott
- Trombones: Jon Goldman, Jason Pier, Gabrial Montez, Nick Barbano
- Guitar: Dom White
- Piano: Emily Nafius, Dan Davis, Richard Stuart
- Bass: Sean Barnett, Sean Emch
- Drums: Michael Agorrilla
- Percussion: Juan Pablo Castillo, Francisco Jose Crow

=== Production ===
- Recording and Mixing engineer: Tom Weir
- Mastering: Lou Hemsey
- Album design: Katie Muller and LMP
