= Kye Palmer =

American trumpet player

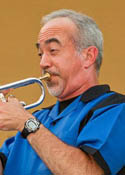
- Kye Palmer, trumpet

Background information
- Born: November 10, 1962 (age 63)
- Origin: Redlands, California, United States
- Genres: Jazz, Latin, rockabilly
- Occupations: Instrumental studio musician, educator
- Instruments: Trumpet, flugelhorn
- Years active: 1981–present
- Formerly of: The Tonight Show Band

Kye Palmer (born November 10, 1962) is an American trumpet player who is a Los Angeles studio musician, most notable as a former member of The Tonight Show Band from 2006 to 2009. On April 10, 2006, Palmer replaced Lee Thornburg in The Tonight Show Band and was there for the last part of Kevin Eubanks's tenure with The Tonight Show. He has recorded on several Grammy Award nominated or winning projects over the past 20 years.

== Early years and education ==
Palmer, a native Californian originally from Redlands, started being interested in music at the age of 7. An early source of inspiration for him was being a part of the well known Stan Kenton Band Clinics at the University of Redlands. After high school he first attended California State University, Long Beach for a year to study music. He transferred to Fullerton College and played trumpet on the Down Beat award-winning LP Time Tripping while playing in the college jazz groups for a year. After two years attending Fullerton College he transferred and earned a bachelor's degree in engineering from Cal Poly Pomona. During that time that he was working professionally as a trumpet player he was also employed at Honeywell Corporation cross-checking wire schematics for U.S. Department of Defense products the company manufactured. He studied privately with such artists as trumpeter Bobby Shew and jazz vibraphonist Charlie Shoemake. "Of the 1,500 or so people that studied with me, Kye was one of those 20 or 25 players that was really important, who understood the music", Charlie Shoemake says. Palmer names Clifford Brown and Freddie Hubbard as his principal influences.

== Professional career ==
Trumpeter Bobby Shew first got Palmer his start on the Woody Herman Orchestra; Palmer toured 1988 through 1990 with the group. Palmer performs and records with the Chris Walden Big Band, and Bill Cunliffe's "Imaginacion" and other groups in the Los Angeles area. He has also performed and recorded with LeAnn Rimes, Hawk-Richard Jazz Orchestra, Bob Dylan, Tony Bennett, Joe Williams, and Diane Schuur, as well as touring Japan with the Clayton-Hamilton Jazz Orchestra and Poncho Sanchez Latin jazz band. Television appearances and soundtracks include The Tonight Show with Jay Leno, Late Night with David Letterman, Good Morning America, the Today Show, Family Guy and Late Night with Conan O'Brien.

He has recorded for numerous major motion picture soundtracks, including Seven Pounds, Man of the Year (2006 film), Three to Tango, Stuart Little, The Secret Life of Pets, Crazy Rich Asians, Selma, Jersey Boys, Skating to New York, Gangster Squad, Seven Pounds, Three to Tango and Me, Myself & Irene. He also appears in the movie and plays on the soundtrack for the 2011 film J. Edgar. Palmer appeared on the Brian Setzer Orchestra's Grammy Award-winning recording of "Caravan", as well as Vavoom! and Boogie Woogie Christmas which were nominated for Grammys, and the certified gold Setzer CD Best of The Big Band. He recorded on the 2005 Grammy-nominated, multi-platinum award-winning CD It's Time (Michael Bublé album). He also recorded with trumpeters Ron King, Marc Lewis, and Ron Stout on the CD The Clifford Brown Project in 2003 on the Capri Record label.

Palmer continues to teach trumpet and is serving as an adjunct professor at California State University, Fullerton.

== Discography (partial) ==
- 1983 Classical Expression, Fullerton College (JLFC)
- 1984 Time Tripping, Fullerton College Jazz Ensemble (AM-PM)
- 1987 Silver Threads Among The Blues, Mark Masters (Seabreeze Jazz)
- 1991 50th Anniversary Celebration - Back To Balboa, Stan Kenton (MAMA Foundation)
- 2000 Me, Myself & Irene, (Music From The Motion Picture) (Elektra)
- 2002 Boogie Woogie Christmas, Brian Setzer (Surfdog)
- 2004 All I Want For Christmas, LeAnn Rimes (Curb)
- 2005 The More I See You, Michael Bublé (Reprise)
- 2005 It's Time, Michael Buble (Reprise)
- 2006 From This Moment On, Diana Krall (Verve)
- 2007 Classic Songs, My Way, Paul Anka (Universal/Decca)
- 2010 Special Delivery, Michael Bublé (Reprise)
- 2011 Sundays In New York, Trijntje Oosterhuis (Blue Note)
- 2012 1619 Broadway - The Brill Building Project, Kurt Elling (Concord Jazz)
- 2014 Full On!, Chris Walden Big Band (Origin)
- 2014 Storytone, Neil Young (Reprise)
- 2014 Come Back to Me Love, Freda Payne (Mack Avenue)
- 2015 We Love Disney, Various artists (Verve)
- 2016 The Secret Life of Pets, (Music From The Motion Picture) (Universal)
- 2018 Love, Michael Bublé (Reprise)
- 2019 Pesci... Still Singing, Joe Pesci (BMG)
- 2020 Running On Faith, Diane Schuur (Jazzheads)
- 2022 Higher, Michael Bublé (Reprise)
- 2022 Novel Noël, Lyn Stanley (A.T. Music)

== See also ==
- Jazz Trumpeters
- The Brian Setzer Orchestra
- The Tonight Show Band
- Kevin Eubanks and The Tonight Show Band
- Clayton-Hamilton Jazz Orchestra
