= K41 =

K41 may refer to:

- K-41 (Kansas highway)
- K41 (nightclub) in Kyiv, Ukraine
- HMS Sunflower (K41), a corvette of the Royal Navy
- INS Nirbhik (K41), a corvette of the Indian Navy
- Piano Concerto No. 4 (Mozart), by Wolfgang Amadeus Mozart
- Potassium-41, an isotope of potassium
- K41 (theory), Kolmogorov´s theory about turbulence
