= Jessica (album) =

Studio album by Gerald Wilson Orchestra of the 80's
- Released: 1983
- Recorded: November 29 and December 6, 1982
- Studio: Mars Studio, Los Angeles, CA
- Genre: Jazz
- Label: Trend; TR-531
- Producer: Albert Marx

Gerald Wilson chronology
Lomelin (1981)	Jessica (1983)	Calafia (1984)

Jessica is an album by Gerald Wilson's Orchestra of the 80's recorded in 1982 and released on the Trend label.

== Reception ==
Professional ratings
Review scores
Source	Rating
AllMusic	4/5 stars

AllMusic rated the album with 4 stars; in his review, Scott Yanow noted: "this is a highly enjoyable and consistently swinging album".

== Track listing ==
All compositions by Gerald Wilson except where noted.

1. "Jessica" - 5:26
2. "I Love You Madly" (Duke Ellington) - 3:36
3. "Blues Bones and Bobby" - 10:24
4. "Getaway" (Beloyd Taylor, Peter Cor Belenky) - 9:27
5. "Sophisticated Lady" (Ellington) - 4:29
6. "Don't Get Around Much Anymore" (Ellington, Bob Russell) - 3:39

== Personnel ==
- Gerald Wilson - composer, arranger, conductor
- Rick Baptist, Bobby Bryant, Oscar Brashear, Hal Espinosa, Snooky Young - trumpet
- Garnett Brown, Jimmy Cleveland, Thurman Green - trombone
- Maurice Spears - bass trombone
- Anthony Ortega, Jerome Richardson, Henry de Vega - alto saxophone
- Roger Hogan, Harold Land, Ernie Watts - tenor saxophone
- Jack Nimitz - baritone saxophone
- Gerald Wiggins - piano
- Harold Land, Jr. - electric piano
- Milcho Leviev - keyboards
- Johnny Williams - bass, electric bass
- Clayton Cameron - drums
