= Robert Frojen =

American water polo player (1930–2005)

- Frojen circa 1956, in USA Olympic team jersey from Olympic team photo

Personal information
- Full name: Robert "Bob" Charles Frojen
- Born: December 1, 1930 Hamburg, Germany
- Died: December 11, 2005 (aged 75) Los Angeles, United States
- Height: 181 cm (5 ft 11 in)
- Weight: 82 kg (181 lb)
- Spouse: Coleen

Sport
- Sport: Water polo
- College team: Fullerton Jr. College; Stanford University
- Club: Southern California WP Club
- Coached by: James R. Smith (Fullerton); Ed Rutloff (Stanford WP); Neal Kohlhase ('56 Olympics)
Medal record
Representing United States
Pan American Games
Silver medal – second place	1955 Mexico City	Men's tournament

Robert "Bob" Charles Frojen (December 1, 1930 – December 11, 2005) was an American water polo player of German descent who competed for Stanford University and participated in the 1956 Summer Olympics in Melbourne, Australia.

== Early life ==
Frojen was born December 1, 1930 in Hamburg, Germany to parents of American descent. He attended Fullerton High School where he was mentored and trained in swimming and water polo by Hall of Fame Coach James R. Smith from around 1946-1948.

=== College ===
He attended Fullerton Jr. College, where he was again coached by James R. Smith, a water polo hall of fame inductee. Completing his education, Frojen played water polo for Stanford University from around 1949-52, where he was coached primarily in water polo by Ed Rudloff and graduated in 1952. One of Frojen's Stanford team mates was James Gaughran, who would later coach swimming and water polo at Stanford, and serve as an Olympic coach. During his tenure at Stanford, Frojen made All-American as a swimmer from 1949-1952, captained the team, and was an All Pacific-8 conference selection in 1952, 1951, and 1950. A strong regional presence during Frojen's tenure, the Stanford water polo team were Pacific Coast Conference Collegiate Champions in 1952, 1951, and 1950.

In addition to playing with college teams, Frojen competed for the Southern California Water Polo Club, and won outdoor water polo championships in 1950 and 1949, and indoor championships in 1957. He also played for California's Whittier Water Polo Club that won a national championship in 1949. In international competition, he received a silver medal as part of the U.S. Water Polo team at the 1955 Pan American Games in Ciudad de Mexico.

=== 1956 Melbourne Olympics ===
Frojen was a member of the American water polo team which finished fifth in the 1956 Olympic water polo tournament in Melbourne, Australia under Head Olympic Coach Neal Kohlhase and Assistant Coach Urho Saari, both Water Polo Hall of Fame members. Frojen played all six matches. Hungary took the gold, Yugoslavia took the silver, and the Russian team captured the bronze. A well-publicized feature of the tournament was a very rough match between pre-Olympic favorite Hungary and Russia that had to be stopped by the referees. On December 6, the Hungarian team won their match against Hungary by a score of 4-0, and went undefeated in the tournament, but considerable animosity existed between the Russian and Hungarian teams as a result of the recent Russian occupation of Hungary in November, 1956, subsequent to a student revolt in the same month.

Frojen later had a career in banking, and served in public relations for the firm Bozell and Jacobs.

He died December 11, 2005 in Los Angeles, California. He was married to wife Coleen.

=== Honors ===
In 1981, he was inducted into the USA Water Polo Hall of Fame.
