= Scheila Gonzalez =

American musician and music educator

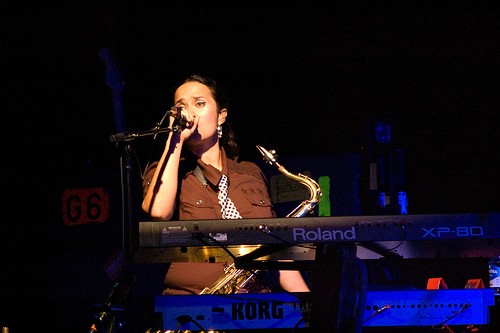
- Gonzalez performing on the Zappa Plays Zappa tour

Background information
- Born: August 5, 1971 (age 55)
- Origin: Los Angeles, California, U.S.
- Genres: Jazz; rock; experimental
- Occupation: Musician
- Instruments: Saxophone; vocals; keyboards; flute
- Member of: DIVA Jazz Orchestra; Zappa Plays Zappa; Men at Work
- Formerly of: Dekajaz; Missing Persons

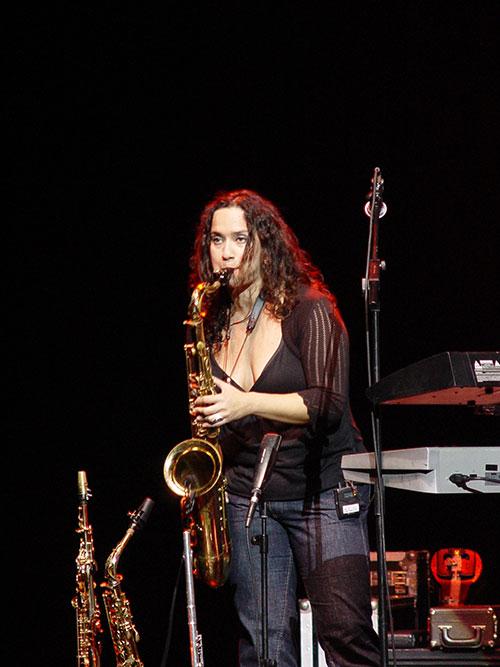
Scheila Gonzalez in Aarhus, Denmark (2009)

Scheila Gonzalez (born August 5, 1971 in Los Angeles, California) is an American Grammy winning multi-instrumentalist and music educator. She is best known for playing the saxophone and other instruments in the all-female DIVA Jazz Orchestra and with artists such as Dweezil Zappa, Alex Acuña, Ray Parker Jr. and many others. Formerly a full-time member of the Zappa Plays Zappa world tour, since 2019 Gonzalez has been touring with Colin Hay as part of a revived and revamped Men at Work lineup, where she sings and plays the alto saxophone as well as several other instruments. Since 2025, Gonzalez has toured with "Weird Al" Yankovic.

== Biography ==
Gonzalez took piano lessons from the age of four and changed to the saxophone at age twelve. After graduating from Anaheim High School in 1989, she attended Fullerton College in the early 1990s and recorded on the Downbeat CD Mainstream. She later transferred to California State University, Northridge to complete her undergraduate degree in music. She sings and plays several woodwind instruments and keyboards.

Gonzalez is the Director of Jazz Combos at Santa Susana Performing Arts High School in Simi Valley, California, gives private lessons, and does freelance work in addition to her album, tour, and concert appearances. She was the co-founder of the jazz group Dekajaz which existed from 1999 - 2013.

== Notable performances ==
From 2018 to the present, Gonzalez has played as a member of the backing band for Colin Hay. In 2019, Hay revived the Men at Work name and Gonzalez has continued to perform under that moniker ever since. Numerous reviews of the band's recent performances highlight her saxophone play on many of Hay's and Men at Work's signature hit songs.

Gonzalez also performed on the Zappa Plays Zappa tour with Dweezil Zappa, beginning with its 2006 inception. She received praise in the media for her instrumental performance and skill during those tours. The show toured the United States, Canada, Europe, Japan, and Australia.

Gonzalez has appeared on television shows such as The Tonight Show backing Garth Brooks and at the BET Music Awards. Scheila Gonzalez has also done film work, appearing in the Christopher Guest film For Your Consideration.

Gonzalez was a member of Weird Al Yankovic’s 2025 Bigger and Weirder tour band.

== Awards ==
Gonzalez won the Shelly Manne Memorial New Talent Award, a jazz music recognition awarded in the Los Angeles area. As a member of the Zappa Plays Zappa ensemble, Gonzalez won a 2009 Best Rock Instrumental Performance Grammy Award for the group's recording of "Peaches en Regalia".
