= Marvin Burns =

American water polo player (1928–1990)

- Burns at 22 in 1960

Personal information
- Born: July 6, 1928 Santa Ana, California, United States
- Died: June 24, 1990 (aged 61) Fullerton, California
- Height: 193 cm (6 ft 4 in)
- Weight: 93 kg (205 lb)

Sport
- Sport: Water polo Center Forward
- College team: Fullerton Junior College; UCLA
- Club: Whittier Swim Club Polo Team; Lynwood Swim Club
- Coached by: James R. Smith (Fullerton)
Medal record
Representing United States
Pan American Games
Silver medal – second place	1955 Mexico City	Men's tournament
Bronze medal – third place	1951 Buenos Aires	Men's tournament

Marvin Duane "Ace" Burns (July 6, 1928 – June 24, 1990) was an American water polo player who competed for Fullerton Junior College, the University of Southern California and the Whittier Swim Club Polo Team, and played for the U.S. in both the 1952 Helsinki Olympics and the 1960 Summer Olympics in Rome.

== Education and water polo ==
Burns was born in Santa Ana, California on July 6, 1928, and attended Fullerton High School. He swam and played water polo for the Fullerton Junior College Hornets where he was managed by Hall of Fame Coach James R. "Jimmy" Smith. He also played for the Whittier Swim Club Water Polo Team which won the National AAU Water Polo Championship in a 4–1 overtime match in August 1949, with Burns scoring a critical goal while playing Center Forward. In 1947, while playing for Fullerton Junior College, Burns was named first string Center Forward on the All Southern California team, and scored 25 goals in the season. For the 1947–48, school year, he ran for Fullerton Junior College treasurer.

After Fullerton, Burns played water polo for the University of Southern California Trojans, where he was twice named an All-American. He graduated with a B.A. in 1952, and later completed a Doctorate in Dentistry in 1960.

By 1950, Burns continued to play for the Whittier Swim Club polo team, which was at times referred to as the Whittier-Fullerton swim club and was coached by Heber Halloway.

== Olympic competition ==
Burns was a member of the American water polo team which finished fourth in the 1952 Olympics. He played five matches. Eight years later he finished seventh with the American team at the 1960 Olympics. Again he played five matches.

He competed as part of the American team at the 1951 and 1955 Pan American Games, that placed third in 1951 winning a bronze medal, and second in 1955, winning a silver medal.

He enjoyed the sport of bodysurfing and was a frequent age-group finalist in the Championships for World Bodysurfing. He later had a career as a dentist.

Burns died June 24, 1990 of cancer in Fullerton, California, where he had been a lifelong resident. He was survived by his wife, Jeremy and two daughters. Services were held at Fullerton's Emmanuel Episcopal Church.

== Honors ==
In 1977, he was inducted into the USA Water Polo Hall of Fame.
