= Bob Bray =

American water polo player (1919–2006)

- Bob Bray from group shot of 1948 London Olympic water polo team

Personal information
- Full name: Rutledge Robert "Bob" Bray
- Born: September 27, 1919 Los Angeles, California, U.S.
- Died: August 26, 2006 (aged 86) Long Beach, California, U.S.

Sport
- Sport: Water polo
- College team: Fullerton Junior College
- Club: Los Angeles Athletic Club (LAAC)
- Coached by: James R. Smith, (Fullerton J.C.); Austin Clapp (48 Olympics, LAAC)

Rutledge Robert "Bob" Bray (September 27, 1919 – August 26, 2006) was an American water polo player for Fullerton Junior College and the Los Angeles Athletic Club, who competed in the 1948 London Olympics. He later had a Real Estate career in Pebble Beach, California.

Bray was born in Los Angeles on September 27, 1919, and attended Los Angeles High School, playing water polo from 1932–36. During his high school years, his team won the Southern California High School Championship in 1937–38. He attended and played Water Polo for Fullerton Junior College from 1937–1939, an outstanding program coached by Hall of Fame Coach and U.S. Olympic Team Coach James R. Smith. As a high scoring left forward for Fullerton, he threw in six goals against Los Angeles Junior College, leading the team to a 9–4 victory in November 1937. With strong participation by Bray, Fullerton Jr. College won the Southern California Jr. College Championships in 1938–39. Bray later transferred to UCLA.

Bray completed his college education at UCLA, but played water polo for the Los Angeles Athletic Club during that period.

== Los Angeles Athletic Club ==
During his active period in Water Polo while at UCLA and while preparing for the Olympics, he swam for the Los Angeles Athletic Club from 1938–48 largely under the coaching management of Austin Clapp. In Water Polo, Bray played as a technically skilled center forward, who could shoot both forehand and backhanded shots and throw passes with equal skill. In August 1947, playing with the Los Angeles Athletic Club, Bray scored four of the team's eight goals, leading his Los Angeles Club team to the finals of the AAU National Water Polo Championship in Detroit. He later swam for the San Francisco Olympic Club. Continuing to excel after leaving Fullerton Junior College, in January 17, 1947, Bray scored seven goals to lead the Los Angeles Athletic Club to a 20–13 victory over Fullerton Jr. College, winning the Southern California American Athletic Union Championship.

== 1948 London Olympics ==
Competing at the men's tournament men's tournament at the 1948 Summer Olympics in London, the U.S. team placed ninth. Italy won the gold medal, Hungary the silver, and the team from the Netherlands won the bronze, in a period when European teams particularly Eastern European teams usually dominated water polo. The U.S. team was composed largely of members of the Los Angeles Athletic Club, and was coached by Austin Clapp. Though the U.S. won their first game against the team from Uruguary 7-0, and then had a tie game with the strong team from Belgium that ended in a score of 4-4, they lost their critical match with Sweden in a 7-0 shutout, and were eliminated from further rounds.

Playing with the Los Angeles Athletic Club in 1948, 1947, 1941, Bray was part of national championship teams. He later played San Francisco's Olympic Club.

Bray served in the U.S. Navy from 1941–45. In later life, he worked in Real Estate for Pebble Beach Realty in California. He died in Long Beach in August, 2006.

== Honors ==
In 1980, he was inducted into the USA Water Polo Hall of Fame.
