= Sallie Fiske =

American journalist and gay rights activist (1928–2004)

- Born: Sallie Maranda Fiske c. 1928; San Francisco, California, U.S.
- Died: February 19, 2004 (aged 75); West Hollywood, California, U.S.
- Occupations: Journalist, television host, activist
- Known for: Early female television journalist in Los Angeles; LGBTQ+ activism
- Notable work: Strictly for Women; West Hollywood Paper

Sallie Maranda Fiske (c. 1928 – February 19, 2004) was an American journalist, television host, and lesbian rights activist. She was among the first women to work in broadcast journalism in Los Angeles, and she later became active in California LGBTQ+ politics, particularly in West Hollywood.

== Early life and education ==
Fiske was born in San Francisco and raised in Southern California, the daughter of journalist Frank Fiske and actress Dorothy Guthrie. After graduating from Fullerton College in the late 1940s, she worked for the May Company department store chain as a fashion buyer and in advertising and public relations.

== Television career ==
Fiske joined KCOP-TV (Channel 13) in Los Angeles in the 1950s, where she became a news editor for newscaster Baxter Ward before he entered politics. In 1956, she began hosting Strictly for Women, a daytime talk show that ran for several years. She also wrote for Ward's evening newscast before leaving in 1962 to return to advertising.

She rejoined KCOP in the 1970s to host another afternoon talk program. In 1977, during singer Anita Bryant's "Save Our Children" campaign, Fiske came out publicly as a lesbian on air. KCOP fired her shortly afterward, ending her television career.

== Activism and later career ==
After her dismissal, Fiske became active in California's gay rights movement. She served as press secretary for the "No on 6" campaign that defeated the Briggs Initiative, a 1978 state ballot measure that sought to bar gay and lesbian teachers from public schools. Fellow activist Ivy Bottini credited Fiske with playing an indispensable role in fundraising and strategy.

Fiske later worked toward the incorporation of West Hollywood and advised its early city council on measures including domestic partnership legislation. In 1984, she managed Valerie Terrigno's successful campaign for the newly formed West Hollywood City Council; Terrigno subsequently became the first openly lesbian mayor in the United States. After Terrigno’s campaign, Fiske served as co-chair of the Stonewall Democratic Club. She was Terrigno's lover during this time period, and she also spoke publicly against Terrigno's indictment for embezzlement. Fiske was quoted as saying, "I believe the whole thing smacks of a witch hunt. There are government agencies that are against women, against gay people, against lesbians. I am appalled."

In 1985, Fiske founded the West Hollywood Paper, a weekly community newspaper that covered local politics and LGBTQ+ issues. Although it closed after two years, she continued freelance writing and later edited Queer Blood (1994), a book about the origins of HIV.

== Views ==
In a 1978 Coast to Coast Times interview, Fiske described herself as "a journalist, an observer of people," and identified as "a feminist—perhaps more of a feminist than a woman." She spoke of gender equality, empathy, and what she called "the co-sexual movement," saying that "women have a greater advantage than men [because] we have become aware of who we are; our searches are very similar."

Fiske also spoke out against representations of women in media. In a 1982 lecture at the Academy of Motion Picture Arts and Sciences, she criticized traditional animated films for portraying women as helpless and influencing young audiences with limiting images of women.

== Death ==
Fiske died on February 19, 2004, at her home in West Hollywood at the age of 75 after a year of declining health. Her papers are preserved at the ONE National Gay & Lesbian Archives at the University of Southern California.

The Los Angeles Times described Fiske as a pioneering television journalist and longtime gay-rights activist. Journalist Shelby Grad described her as a mentor whose "empathy and rage at the forces she felt were killing her community" transformed those around her.

== Personal life ==
Fiske was briefly married in the 1950s and had one daughter, Deborah, and a granddaughter, Sallie.
