= Dekajaz =

Los Angeles concert jazz band (1999–2013)

- Origin: Los Angeles, California, U.S.
- Genre: Jazz
- Years active: 1999–2013
- Label: Dekajaz
- Past members: Scheila Gonzalez; Sharon Hirata; Lee Secard; Jennifer Hall; Glenda Smith; Lee Thornburg; Les Benedict; Steve Gregory; Josh Nelson; Sherry Luchette; Megan Foley
- Website: www.dekajaz.com

Dekajaz was a 10 piece concert jazz band based in Los Angeles. The group was critically acclaimed and most notably was founded to promote under-represented female jazz artists in the Southern California region much like the group Maiden Voyage. The group had many prominent performances in Los Angeles during their existence. Their album Eclectikos was released in September 2003.

== History ==
The DekaJaz Tentet first came together as an all female jazz group in the winter of 1999 as an idea of co-leaders Scheila Gonzalez (sax), Glenda Smith (trumpet), and Megan Foley (drums, arranger). Eventually the group did evolve into including certain male artists such as trumpeter Lee Thornburg, saxophonist Lee Secard and others. The group called upon the writing and arranging talents of Jack Cooper, David Caffey, Rick Lawn, Dan Higgins, Paul McKee, as well as their own Lee Secard, Megan Foley and Josh Nelson. Working with such a diverse group of players and composer/arrangers gave the band its unique style and sound. By the time the group was ready to record a CD in 2002, they had settled on a set of personnel who was consistent and knew the book of original, challenging music. The most noted performance of the group was at the 2005 International Association for Jazz Education Conference in Long Beach, California.

== Reception of the group ==
"This ensemble has become what it set out to be. It is a first rate group with talented players playing great arrangements. They have their own identifiable sound.....a breath of fresh air in today's music scene." - Jeff Hamilton

"The group consists of five women and five men who are not very much known in the jazz industry. They perform a program of original jazz music that focuses on complexity and technical skill of music." - Gary Foster

== Members ==
- Alto sax/flute/soprano sax - Scheila Gonzalez
- Tenor sax/flute/clarinet - Sharon Hirata
- Baritone Sax - Lee Secard (Jennifer Hall earlier)
- Trumpet (lead) - Glenda Smith
- Trumpet (jazz) - Lee Thornburg
- Trombone - Les Benedict
- Guitar - Steve Gregory
- Piano - Josh Nelson
- Bass - Sherry Luchette
- Drums - Megan Foley

== Discography ==
- Eclectikos (2003)

== See also ==
- Scheila Gonzalez
