= Time Tripping =

Studio album by the Fullerton College Jazz Band
- Released: 1983, initial release 1984 for Discovery Records, Trend AM-PM
- Recorded: Fullerton College; Fullerton, California
- Genre: Jazz, Big band, vocal, instrumental
- Length: 42:41
- Label: Discovery Records, Trend AM-PM label
- Producer: Albert Marx

The Fullerton College Jazz Band chronology
Escape To Asylum (1982)	Time Tripping (1983)	Primarily Jazz (1984)
- cat. # Trend AM-PM Records AM-10

Audio sample
- "Battle Of The Bop Brothers": file; help

Audio sample
- "Straight Tone and Strive Ahead": file; help

Time Tripping is an album (LP Vinyl) released by the Fullerton College Jazz Band for the Discovery Records Trend AM-PM label, it became the Down Beat Magazine 1st Place Award Winner in the College Big Band Jazz category for 1983.

== Background ==
In 1981 the Music Department at Fullerton College built a 16 track in house recording facility which was to serve as a teaching tool for both student music groups and students wanting to take recording technology classes at a vocational level. Time Tripping is the second of many albums to come out of this studio to feature the award-winning Fullerton College Jazz Band. The LP does contain tracks from three of the Fullerton College jazz groups: Jazz Band I, Jazz Band II, Connection Jazz Combo. The distinctive qualities about the LP that set it apart from numerous college jazz records (what people think of as promotional demos) is the fact it was a two-year community college able to get on a label so quickly and the LP received 1st place as the Down Beat Magazine best College Big Band Jazz album for 1983. Albert Marx, who was the owner of Discovery Records/Trend Records AM-PM label, became very impressed with the band and the level of the music coming from the jazz groups at Fullerton College. He decided to support the younger, up and coming jazz students/players from the greater Los Angeles/Southern California region by producing certain LPs. Dave Dexter, Jr., formerly with Capitol Records and a writer for both Down Beat and Billboard Magazines, did the liner notes for the LP jacket. "Frankly, I detected no difference in the quality of the music," Dave Dexter, Jr. says from the liner notes, when hearing the different groups' tracks.

The album beat out recordings in Down Beat from heavy-weight groups at large universities and prestigious music schools such as the Eastman School of Music's Jazz Orchestra, the University of Miami's Concert Jazz Band and North Texas State University's Grammy nominated One O'Clock Lab Band. After this recording there became a consistent tradition of musicians coming from the Fullerton College program who have worked with major musical acts, on major studio and movie projects, and hold positions in higher education in music. The roster on this album is self-evident as to the diversity and level of student musicians Fullerton College developed at that time and has for many years. In 1998 the group and one track from the album ("Battle Of The Bop Brothers") was featuring on a compilation CD released by BMG Records entitled "Taking Notes - Volume 2, Showcasing the Worlds Top Jazz Students." This same track is also featured on the 1998 CD Celebration - The Fullerton College Jazz Festival 25th Anniversary.

== Track listing ==
All tracks are written by various artists listed.

No.	Title	Length
1.	"Straight Tone And Strive Ahead (Dan Radlauer)"	4:06
2.	"Sienna (Roger Myers)"	6:48
3.	"Cozumel Rendezvous (James Linahon)"	7:50
4.	"The Umpire Strikes Back (Matt Catingub)"	2:41
5.	"Battle Of The Bop Brothers (Matt Catingub)"	4:04
6.	"Soft Summer Breeze (Terry Blackley, arr. Tom Ranier)"	6:04
7.	"Beach Bum Memories (Mark Stephens)"	5:07
8.	"Yo Mombo (Charles Argersinger)"	5:02
Total length:		42:41

== Recording Sessions ==
- recorded January 26, 27, and 28, 1983, Fullerton College, Fullerton, California

== Personnel ==
=== Musicians ===
- Conductors: Terry Blackley and James Linahon
- Piano (guest soloist): Tom Ranier
- Sax (guest soloist): Ernie Del Fante
- Trumpet (guest soloist): James Linahon
- Saxes and woodwinds: Steve Villa, Steve Alaniz, Jack Cooper, Phil Walker,

Harold Manning, Brian Bez, Tony Morris, Edmund Velasco, Laura Nixon, Ed Valizan

- Trumpets and flugelhorns: Charlie Peterson, Phillip Wightman, Kye Palmer, Randy Ames, Mike Anthony, Robert Villegas, Phil Peterson, Mark New, Brett Pallet
- Trombones: Tim Hoff, Mark McLaren, Rich Berkeley, Clint Anna, Scott Eilers, Roger Olsen, Wendell Kelly, Pat McCarty, Bob Heller, Dale Sanders
- Guitar: Randy Penland, Rusty Anderson
- Piano: Mark Stephens, Barbara Farkas
- Bass: Tim Givens, Denise Briese
- Drums: Dave Hitchings, Pat Ready

=== Production ===
- Recording engineers: Alex Cima and James Linahon
- Second recording engineer: Randy Beers
- Mixing engineers: Alex Cima, Terry Blackley, Roger Myers, and James Linahon.
- Mastering: Dave Ellsworth
- Photography: Tom Leonard and James Aul
- Cover photo: Peggy Rahman
- Liner notes: Dave Dexter, Jr.
- Album title: Karen Ray-Blackley
- Album design: Lenora Hennessy, KM Records
- Album coordination: Karen Stone, KM Records
- Album supervision: Debra Robins

== Reception ==
Down Beat Magazine 1st Place Award Winner in the College Big Band Jazz category

Professional ratings
Review scores
Source	Rating
Down Beat	1st Place Award Winner
LA Weekly	very positive
Jazz Journal International	very positive
Cadence Magazine	very positive
Schwann catalogue	(listing), 1991
