= James R. Smith =

American water polo player and coach (1904–1986)

- Smith as Stanford Coach

Biographical details
- Born: 1904; Oakland, California
- Died: September 7, 1986 (aged 82); Foster, California
- Education: University of Southern California

Playing career
- 1924–1928: University of Southern California
- Positions: Swimming, water polo

Coaching career (HC unless noted)
- 1929–1931: Pacific Coast Club; Player and coach
- 1931–1932: Long Beach City College
- 1932–1962: Fullerton Jr. College; Fullerton High School
- 1965–1971: Stanford University; Freshman swimming Asst. varsity swim coach

Accomplishments and honors

Championships
- '55 Pan Am Games Silver Medal; U.S. Nat. Water Polo Team

Awards
- 1971 CSCAA 40-year award Helms Athletic Medal for Water Polo '92 International Swimming Hall of Fame; U.S. Water Polo Hall of Fame; 1985 Peter Uebberoth Award

James Roy Smith (1904 – September 7, 1986) was a water polo competitor for the University of Southern California from 1928 to 1932, and a Hall of Fame Water Polo Coach for Fullerton High School and Fullerton Jr. College from around 1932–1962. He coached a total of seven Olympians during his career. Serving on the United States Olympic and National AAU Water Polo Committees, in 1985 he received the Peter Uebberoth Award, America's top honor for achievement in the sport of Water Polo. He developed many of the modern rules which are used in competition today, authored three books on Water Polo, and helped design the yellow rubberized ball adopted by FINA in 1956 which greatly enhanced spectator interest in the sport.

== Education and athletics ==
Smith was born in 1904 in Oakland, California. He lettered in water polo and swimming at Long Beach Poly High in 1922–24, where he served as Team captain. He was a collegiate letterman in both polo and swimming from 1924 to 1928, at the University of Southern California, where he captained the team in 1927, and captained both swimming and water polo in 1928. He played and coached for the Pacific Coast Club from 1929 to 1931, and also captained the Los Angeles Athletic Club Team during the same years. At USC, he completed a degree in Business in 1928 and a Masters in Education in 1935. In 1956, he coached the U.S. Olympic Team Trials for the armed services.

== Coaching ==
From 1931 to 1932, he coached Long Beach City College, then coached Fullerton Jr. College and High School from around 1932–1962, except for his time serving with the Navy in WWII. He coached the silver medal-winning U.S. Water Polo Team at the Pan Am Games in 1955. In 1956, he was assigned to the Air Wing Staff of the Naval Air Station at Los Alamitos, where he served as an Aquatics trainer. By 1957, eight of his former team members had become coaches, with the number eventually reaching over 30. He coached 4 teams that won a total of 164 team championships including five on the national level, six in State championships, and five Amateur Athletic Union championships.

Smith served in the Navy, was a WWII era veteran eventually attaining the rank of Captain, and coached the 1956 U.S. Olympic Team Trials for the armed services. He served as an Aquatics Phys. Ed. instructor and coach during his Naval service.

=== Outstanding athletes coached ===
While coaching Fullerton in 1957, he considered his top Water Polo players to be 1948 Olympian Bob Bray, 1948 Olympian Devere Christensen, and 1955 Pan American Games Silver medalist Dr. Thomas Ostman, who competed with the Whittier Swim Club Water Polo team when they won the 1950 AAU Water Polo Championship. He also included 1955 Pan American Games medalist 1956–60 Olympian Robert Horn of the 1961-2 Fullerton team, and two-time Olympian Marvin Duane Burns of the 1952 Fullerton team. Among his more distinguished disciples, Smith coached U.S. Navy Commander Dean H. Forsgren at the 1950 AAU National Championship as part of the Whittier Swim and Polo Club. One of Smith's top swimmers at Fullerton in 1949 was long serving Long Beach City College Coach, 1952 Olympic swimmer and three-time Olympic Head Water Polo Coach Monte Nitzkowski.

From 1965 to 1971, Smith served as Freshman water polo coach and Assistant Varsity swim Coach at Stanford University.

=== Service to swimming community ===
Smith wrote articles for the Associated Press, Swimming World Magazine and Water Polo Scoreboard. He authored several books on aquatic coaching and the mechanics of play. His 1936 book, Playing and Coaching Water Polo, broke ground as one of the earlies texts on the sport, and he later authored "Water Polo in the Olympics". He served as a member of the U.S. Olympic Water Polo Committee from 1948 to 1956, and the National AAU Water Polo Committee from 1948 to 1976. He developed a water polo ball made with an inflatable bladder and a rubber fabric cover, which improved performance, adding spectator interest to the game.

Smith died of cancer on September 7, 1986 at his home in Foster City, California. He was survived by his wife Claire, children, step-children, and grandchildren. After memorial services on September 17, his ashes were scattered over San Francisco's Golden Gate Bridge.

== Honors ==
He was a recipient of the National Colleges Coaches Association Plaque for being a 25-year collegiate coach, and a 40-year award from the College Swimming Coaches of America in 1971. He was a recipient of the Helms Athletic Medal for outstanding achievement in Water Polo. As a highly accomplished collegiate coach, and an officer in U.S. Water Polo organizations, he was inducted into the International Swimming Hall of Fame in 1992.

In 1990, the United States Water Polo Award was established in memory of Jimmie Smith and his contributions to the sport of water polo. The award is given annually to an individual or group, recognizing outstanding contributions to water polo in the United States. The trophy is exhibited at the International Swimming Hall of Fame. He was a recipient of the Peter Uebberoth Award, America's top honor in Water Polo in 1985.

== See also ==
- List of members of the International Swimming Hall of Fame
- Water polo ball
- Monte Nitzkowski, rival Water Polo coach of Long Beach State, was coached by James R. Smith.
- Robert Horn, UCLA Water Polo coach from 1964 to 1990, was coached by James R. Smith.
