= K41 (nightclub) =

Nightclub in Ukraine

Coordinates: 50.47144°N 30.49851°E

K41 (also called ∄ or Kyrylivska 41) is a nightclub in Podil, Kyiv, Ukraine. The club hosts many international DJs and is in what was a 19th-century brewery and has an occupancy capacity of 15,000. The club owns and operates the record label Standard Deviation and has been a queer safe space. No photos of the club are allowed inside, patrons are required to put tape over their phone-lenses upon entering. The club has occasionally been the target of abuse by Neo-Nazi vandals.
