= Fullerton Union High School =

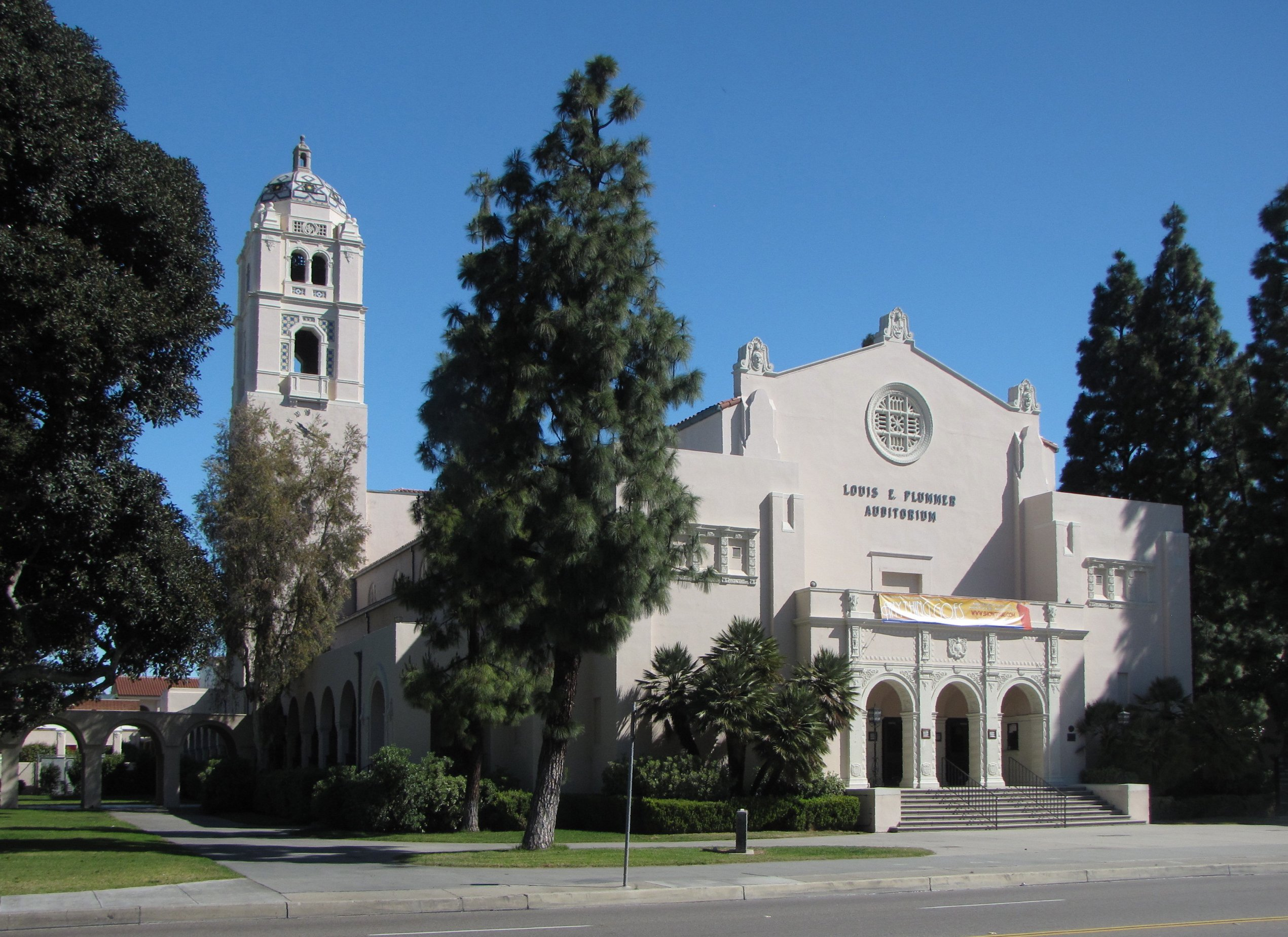

Location
- 201 East Chapman Avenue; Fullerton, California 92832; United States; 33°52′30″N 117°55′16″W

Information
- School type: Secondary
- Motto: Floreat Fullerton! (Let Fullerton Flourish!)
- Established: 1893
- School board: Fullerton Joint Union High School District
- Superintendent: Steve McLaughlin
- Principal: Jon Caffrey
- Teaching staff: 73.43 (on an FTE basis)
- Grades: 9–12
- Enrollment: 1,848 (2023–2024)
- Student to teacher ratio: 25.17
- Colors: Red and White
- Team name: Red Hawks
- Newspaper: The Pleiades
- Website: www.FullertonHigh.org

Fullerton Union High School is a public high school located in the Orange County, California city of Fullerton, operated by the Fullerton Joint Union High School District.

== History ==
In 1893 a special election was held to create Fullerton Union High School. The school's first classroom, a rented room on the second floor of the Fullerton Elementary School building, was adequate to house the eight pupils, which constituted the first year's enrollment and the 32 books which made up the library. The high school was the second in Orange County.

In 1908, FUHS's enrollment was increasing at the rate of 18 percent a year. To accommodate the growth, the school was moved to new quarters on West Commonwealth Avenue, an area now known as Amerige Park.

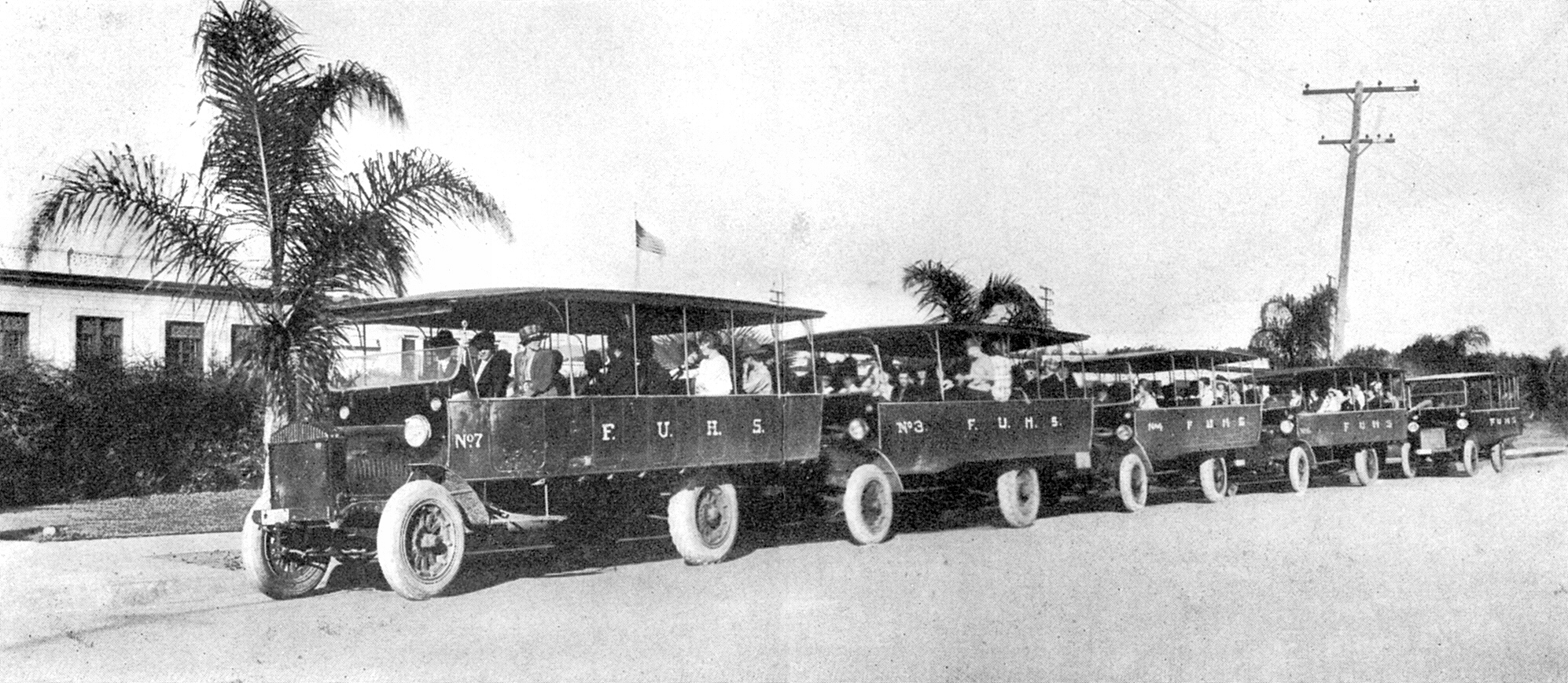
Fullerton Union High School buses, 1921

School enrollment continued to grow and within two years a new polytechnic building was built to ease the overcrowding. But on November 17, 1910, the day before it could be occupied, the older FUHS building burned to the ground.

FUHS was housed in the polytechnic building and four tents that year. After the fire, the school's trustees debated the best location for rebuilding. The district owned the ground on which the polytechnic building stood, but the campus was small, and school work was disrupted by the numerous Santa Fe trains that roared by each day.

In 1911, the present site was purchased one block east of Harbor (Spadra) Boulevard. A walnut orchard was removed prior to building, and the former site was sold to the City of Fullerton for use as a park.

The school's facilities have changed over the years to meet educational and community needs. Fullerton Auditorium (formerly Louis E. Plummer Auditorium) was built in 1930-32 and its original ironwork, which was made by students on the campus, was kept when it was refurbished and remodeled to meet earthquake standards in 1972 (the first class to use the auditorium for Baccalaureate was the Class of 1972). Since then the stadium, locker rooms, and the agriculture complex have been rebuilt. The latest replacement was the swimming pool and the science building. In 2009 a new building housing many new classrooms including several new computer driven classrooms was opened.

Renovations of Fullerton Auditorium were completed in 1993. It included new lighting, audio and dressing room upgrades. Air conditioning and an orchestra lift was added as well. The Charles Kassler fresco "Pastoral California" was uncovered and completely restored in 1997.

1910 fire

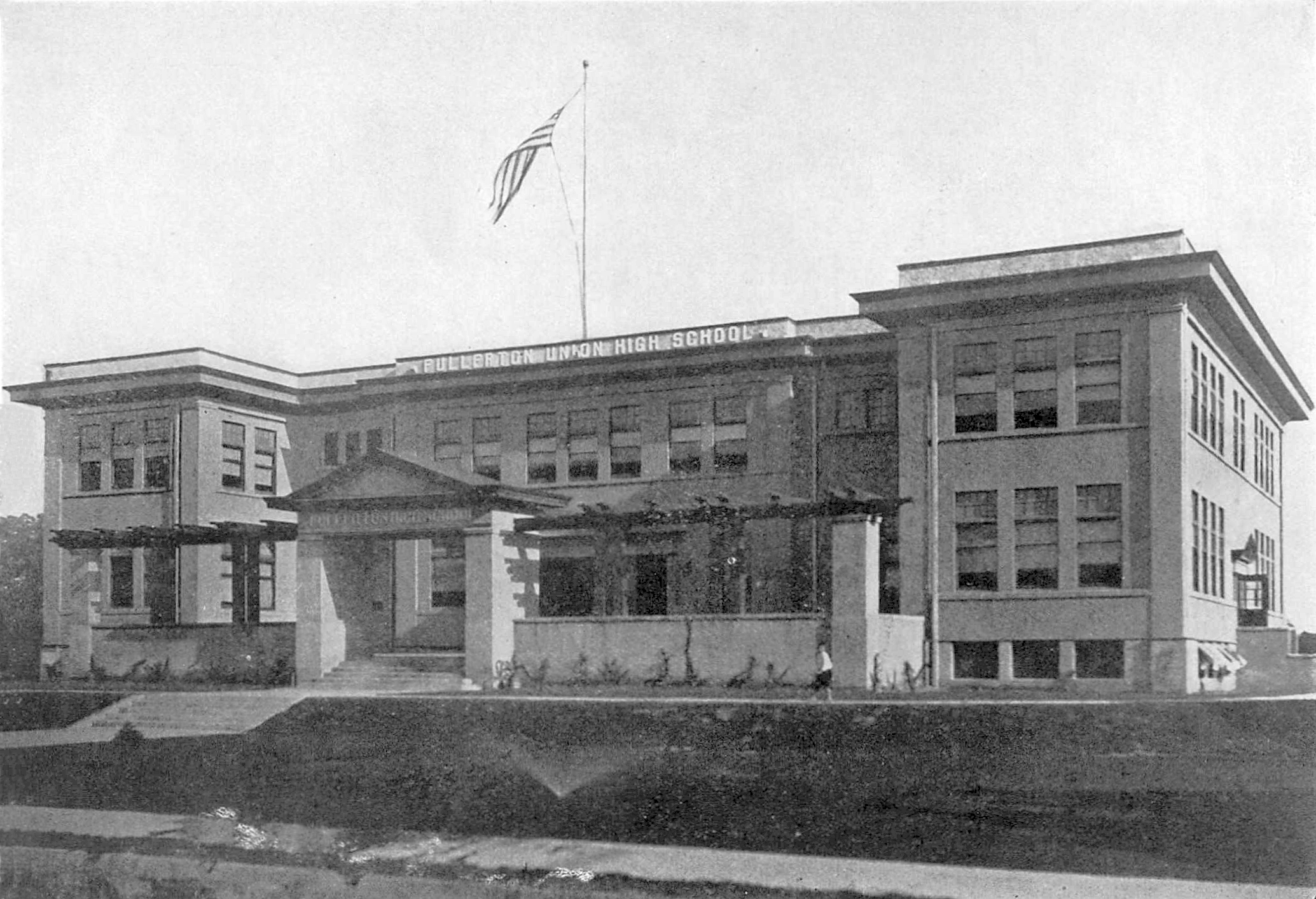
Fullerton Union High School before fire destroyed the building, 1910

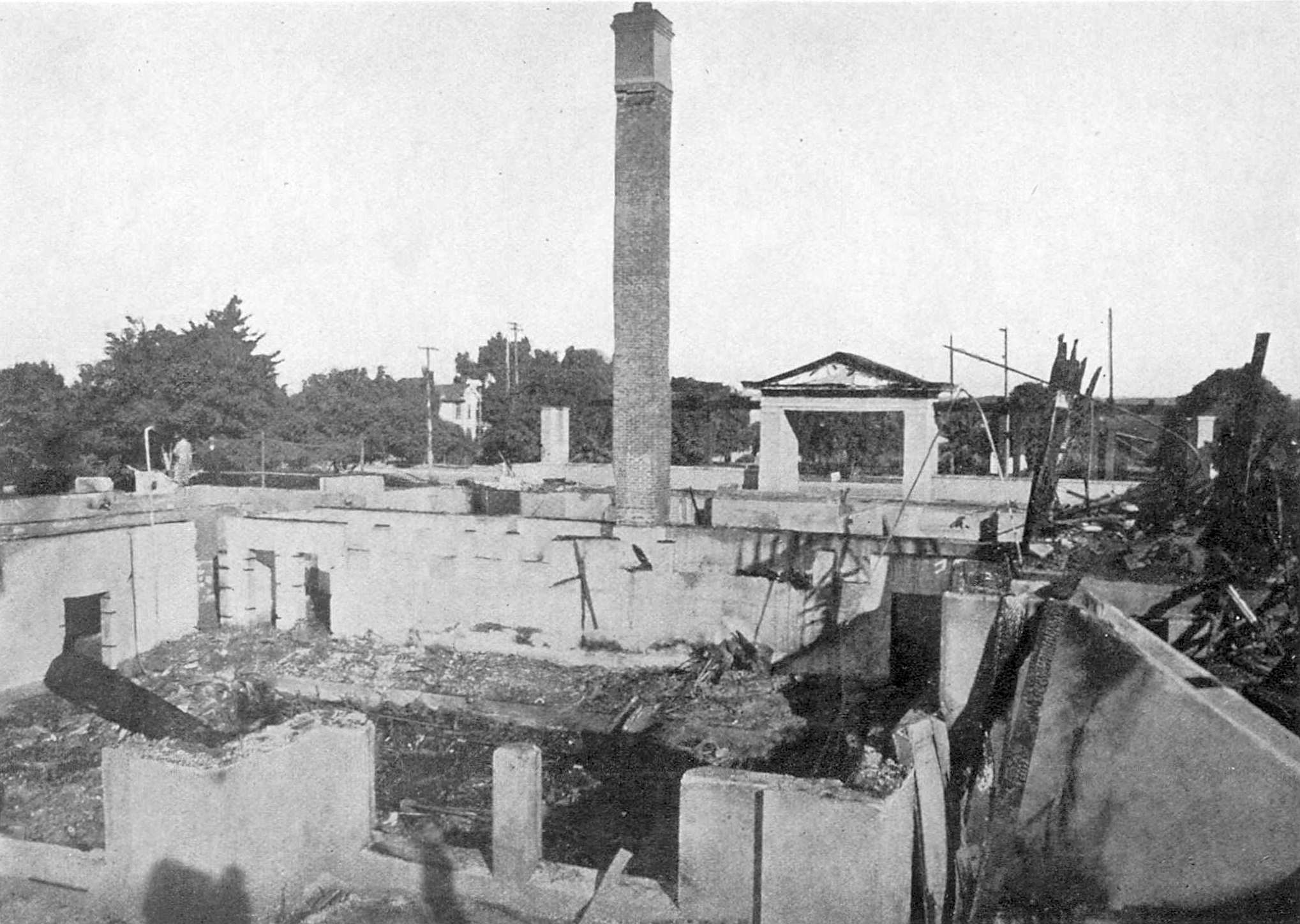
After fire destroyed the main building, 1910

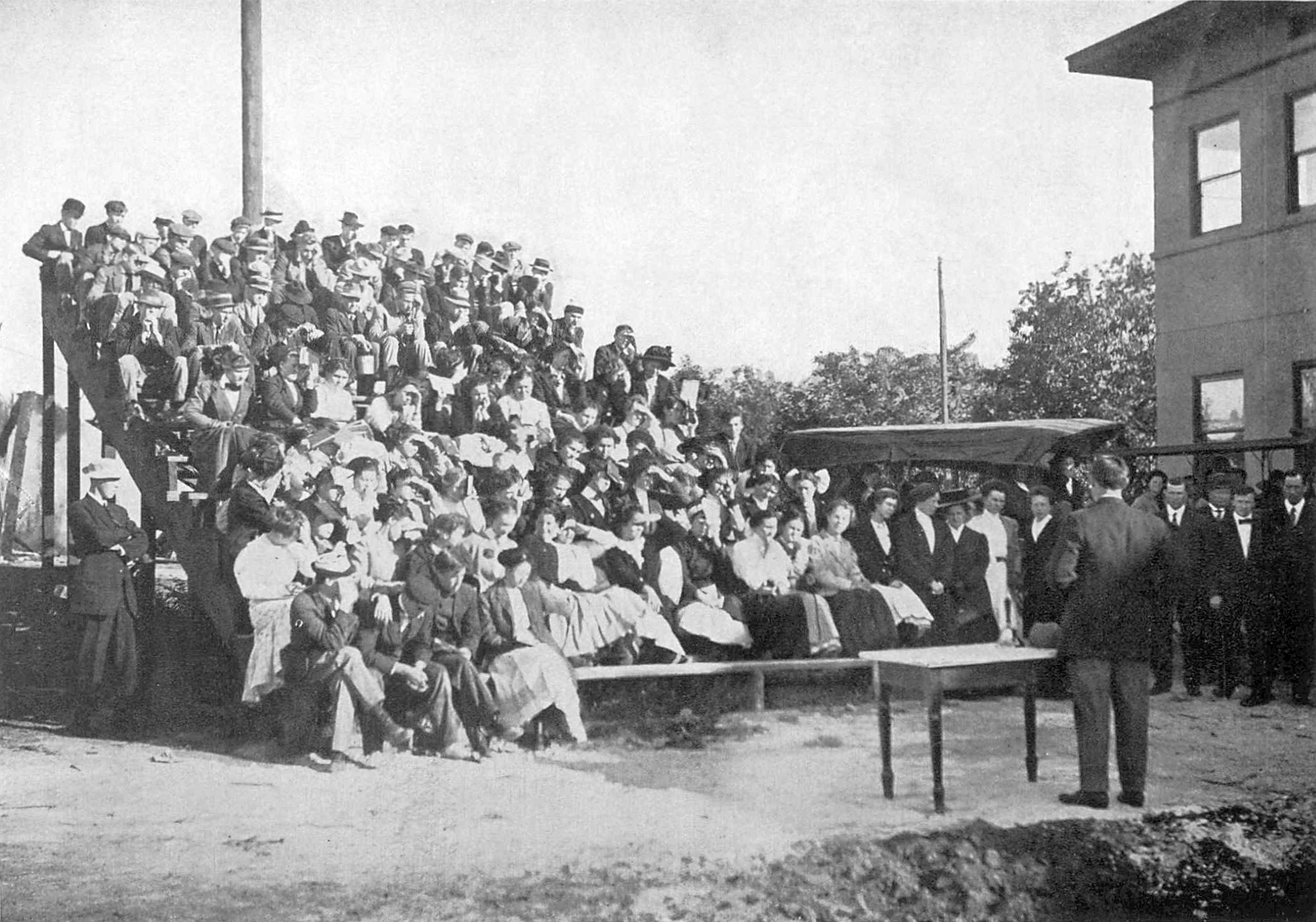
Student assembly after the fire. The ruins are behind the students; the newly-completed Technical Trades Building (right) escaped the fire.

== Academics ==
The school provides opportunities for students to be involved in Honors, Advanced Placement (AP), and International Baccalaureate (IB) courses.

== Athletics ==
Fullerton's sports teams are known as the Indians, and are members of the California Interscholastic Federation's Southern Section.

Beginning in the 2026-27 academic year, Fullerton’s sports teams will be known as Red Hawks.

== Notable alumni ==
Many of Fullerton's notable alumni are listed on the FUHS Wall of Fame.

- Bob Blackburn, NBA play-by-play announcer
- David Boies, lawyer, including Bush v. Gore and Perry v. Schwarzenegger
- Hoby Brenner, NFL player
- John Brenner, NCAA shot put and discus champion
- John V. Briggs, California State Senator and Assemblyman
- Marvin Burns, Olympic water polo player
- Steve Busby, Major League Baseball player
- Jim Bush, coach in National Track and Field Hall of Fame
- Vicki Calhoun, former backing vocalist of Red Hot Chili Peppers
- Del Crandall, Major League Baseball player and manager
- Sue S. Dauser, Superintendent of the United States Navy Nurse Corps
- Viet D. Dinh, lawyer, legal scholar and Assistant Attorney General of United States
- Daniel Fells, NFL player
- Darren Fells, NFL player
- Leo Fender, electric guitar innovator
- Keith Ginter, Major League Baseball player
- Willard Hershberger, Major League Baseball player
- Walter Johnson, Major League Baseball player and Hall of Fame member (did not graduate)
- Chuck Jordan, vice president of GM design
- Natalie Kaaiawahia, national high school record holder, shot put
- Michael Lorenzen, Major League Baseball player
- Erin Mackey, actress
- Alfonso Márquez, Major League Baseball umpire
- Thomas L. McFadden (class of 1896), college football player and attorney
- Richard Nixon, 37th President of the United States (did not graduate; transferred to Whittier High School for his junior and senior year)
- Chris Norby, California State Assemblyman
- Jim Norton, professional football player
- Brig Owens, NFL player
- John Raitt, actor and singer
- Cruz Reynoso, California Supreme Court justice
- Ann Stanford, poet
- Keith Van Horne, NFL player
- Arky Vaughan, Major League Baseball player and Hall of Fame member
- Diane Wakoski, poet
- Mike Warren, Major League Baseball player
- Jessamyn West, author
