= Dan Radlauer =

American film and television composer (born 1957)

- Born: Daniel Radlauer; April 26, 1957 (age 69)
- Origin: La Habra Heights, California, U.S.
- Genres: Big band, jazz, rock, Latin
- Occupations: Composer, conductor, music producer, educator
- Instruments: Bass, guitar, piano, keyboards
- Years active: 1977 to present

Dan Radlauer (born April 26, 1957 in Los Angeles) is an American film and television composer, who was born in Los Angeles and grew up in the eastern suburb of Los Angeles County, La Habra Heights. Radlauer is the recipient of four BMI composer awards and has received special recognition at independent film festivals.

== Early life, musical training, early successes ==
Dan Redlaurer was raised in La Habra Heights, California (Southeastern range of the Puente Hills). He started playing music at the age of 8 with guitar and later learned piano, bass, accordion and various other stringed instruments. Great inspiration came from his parents Ed and Ruth Radlauer, who are well known book authors. The advanced musical training he received was while attending school in the music department at Fullerton College in the late 1970s, playing and writing for their jazz and pop groups. During this time he also studied with film composer Albert Harris. Radlauer's big-band composition "Straight Tone and Strive Ahead" is the opening track of the Fullerton College Jazz Band 1983 Down Beat Award-winning LP Time Tripping. Radlauer also did notable writing for the big bands Maiden Voyage, the Big Band Jazz Machine, and publisher C.L. Barnhouse.

His first 15 years of professional composing were in the area of TV and radio commercials; companies worked for include Coke, Mattel, Nissan, Greenlight Financial, Albertsons, and Pizza Hut. He has worked in the R&B and pop music fields recording with stars such as Teena Marie and co-produced the original TV's Greatest Hits CD.

== TV and film scoring ==
By 2001 Radlauer started to be contracted much more for music scoring in the television and film industry doing feature length work. He has composed music for numerous reality TV, drama, and sitcom shows to include For the Love of Ray J, Ruby, Flavor of Love, and The Surreal Life. He was a contributing writer working with Randy Edelman on the 2008 action adventure film The Mummy: Tomb of the Dragon Emperor. Other titles he has also scored as independent, feature-length movies, and documentaries include The Reflecting Pool (2008), Bad Guys, Salvation (2007), Pip and Zastro (2006), She Wolves of the Wasteland (1987), Phoenix the Warrior (1988), and Thunder Geniuses.

== Music education, teaching ==
As an educator, Radlauer worked at the Idyllwild Arts Academy and at the PS#1 Elementary School in Santa Monica as well as creating music ensembles at New West Middle School in Los Angeles and Pali High School. He has been adjudicating jazz festivals for over 20 years, as well as providing instruction for music educators in Southern California. He has also mentored young musicians and composers, including his son Ruben of Model/Actriz.
