= Trend Records =

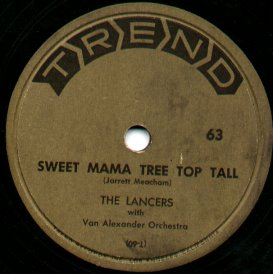
- Trend record
- Founded: 1953
- Founder: Albert Marx, Paul W. Trousdale
- Defunct: 1955
- Distributor: Various
- Genre: Jazz, novelty, popular, country
- Country of origin: United States
- Location: Los Angeles

Trend Records was a post-World War II United States jazz record label.

Trend's back catalogue was purchased by Albert Marx, an authority on jazz music and entrepreneur who founded Discovery Records in 1948, and much of its material was reissued in the 1980s. Among those who recorded for Trend are Van Alexander, Robert Conti, Shelly Manne, Clare Fischer, Dick Berk, Matt Dennis and Ray Linn.

== Background ==
Two men that were connected with the label were former Discovery Records chief, Albert Marx and a wealthy construction and oil man, Paul W. Trousdale.

The label in its early days had the intent of releasing jazz, r&b, standards, western melodies and novelties. They were handling all the main formats at the time, 45s, 78s and long play records.

One of the groups that was signed to the label was the Dave Pell Octet. Albert Marx came to one of their rehearsals. Dave Pell recalled in an interview decades later that Marx flipped when he heard them and the ensemble was soon recording for the label.

== History ==
It was mentioned in the April 18, 1953, issue of The Billboard that the label had released its first record which was a novelty. The record was "Wang Wang Blues" backed with "Somebody Stole My Gal". The recordings featured "Gus Meuller, Buster Johnson, Leo Wood and Henry Busse. Jerry Feilding who had recently signed to the label was set to release an LP album of standards.

In late 1953, the Ernie Andrews release, “Make Me A Present of You” and “Don’t Lead Me On” were getting a good amount of airplay in the Los Angeles region, and there were predictions of them having hit potential. By January 1954, the record was reportedly making big sales throughout the US and Al Marx was on a promotional tour throughout the East. The record was a boost to Andrews' career with him now a popular nightclub attraction. Not only had it broken wide into r&b but it was also doing well in pop and getting a good amount of juke box play. The Lancers were also doing well with their release, "Peggy O'Neil" bw "Stop Chasin' Me Baby" which was released on Trend 70.

According to the 78RPM Club, label went bankrupt in March, 1955. With Kapp Records purchasing their catalogue in February 1956. It's likely that the label with its good catalogue wasn't meeting the expectations of Paul W Trousdale. Being the major investor, he decided to sell the label in the spring of 1955. In February 1956, Dave Kapp of Kapp Records purchased the label for a healthy five figure amount. Following the sale, Albert Marx had a short career in management and had signed up singer Johnny Holiday as the first on his roster. Dave Pell who had recorded for the label had already signed an exclusive deal with Atlantic in April 1955.

It appears that Ben Hurwitz was involved with the legacy of the label, and the name was changed to Prime Records in 1966.

== Later years ==
Paul W. Trousdale died in Santa Barbara, California in April 1990 at age 75.

== See also ==
- List of record labels
