= Discovery Records =

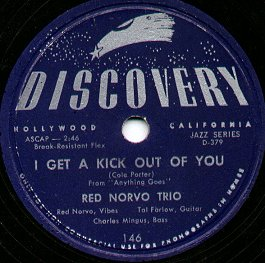
- Discovery record by Red Norvo
- Parent company: Warner Music Group
- Founded: 1948
- Founder: Albert Marx
- Defunct: 1991
- Status: Inactive
- Genre: Jazz
- Country of origin: U.S.
- Location: Hollywood, California

Discovery Records was a United States–based record company and label known for its recordings of jazz music.

Discovery was founded in 1948 by jazz fan and promoter Albert Marx; it was headquartered in Hollywood, California. The record label would eventually record jazz notables such as Dizzy Gillespie, Georgie Auld, Red Norvo, Art Pepper, Joe Pass and Charles Mingus. Discovery later recorded such performers as singers Lorez Alexandria and Ernie Andrews, and Grammy winning composer-band leader Gerald Wilson.

Marx had first become artistic for later Musicraft Records in 1944 before starting his own label. In the 1970s, Musicraft Records was revived through Discovery/Trend by Albert Marx in Los Angeles. He also started the Trend AM-PM label in the 1980s to document and promote talented educational, college level jazz ensembles to include the Los Angeles Jazz Workshop, Nashville Jazz Machine and the Fullerton College Jazz Ensemble. His estate sold the Discovery, Trend and Musicraft jazz labels in 1991 to Jac Holzman, which he refashioned into a contemporary label. In 1993, Discovery Records was acquired by Warner Music Group and was absorbed by Sire Records in 1996.

== See also ==
- List of record labels
