= Fullerton College =

Community college in Fullerton, California, US

- Other name: FC
- Former name: Fullerton Junior College (1913–1972)
- Motto: Excellence. Elevated
- Type: Public community college
- Established: 1913 (113 years ago)
- Parent institution: North Orange County Community College District
- Accreditation: Accrediting Commission for Community and Junior Colleges
- Budget: $87 million
- President: Cynthia Olivo
- Students: 21,017 (spring 2019)
- Location: Fullerton, California, U.S. 33°52′28″N 117°55′07″W
- Campus: Metropolitan, 83 acres (33.6 ha)
- Colors: Stinger Blue, Hornet Yellow
- Nickname: Hornets
- Sporting affiliations: Orange Empire Conference; California Community College Athletic Association; Southern California Football Association
- Mascot: Buzzy the Hornet
- Website: www.fullcoll.edu

Fullerton College (FC) is a public community college in Fullerton, California, United States. It is part of the California Community Colleges System and the North Orange County Community College District. Established in 1913, it is the oldest community college in continuous operation in California.

== History ==
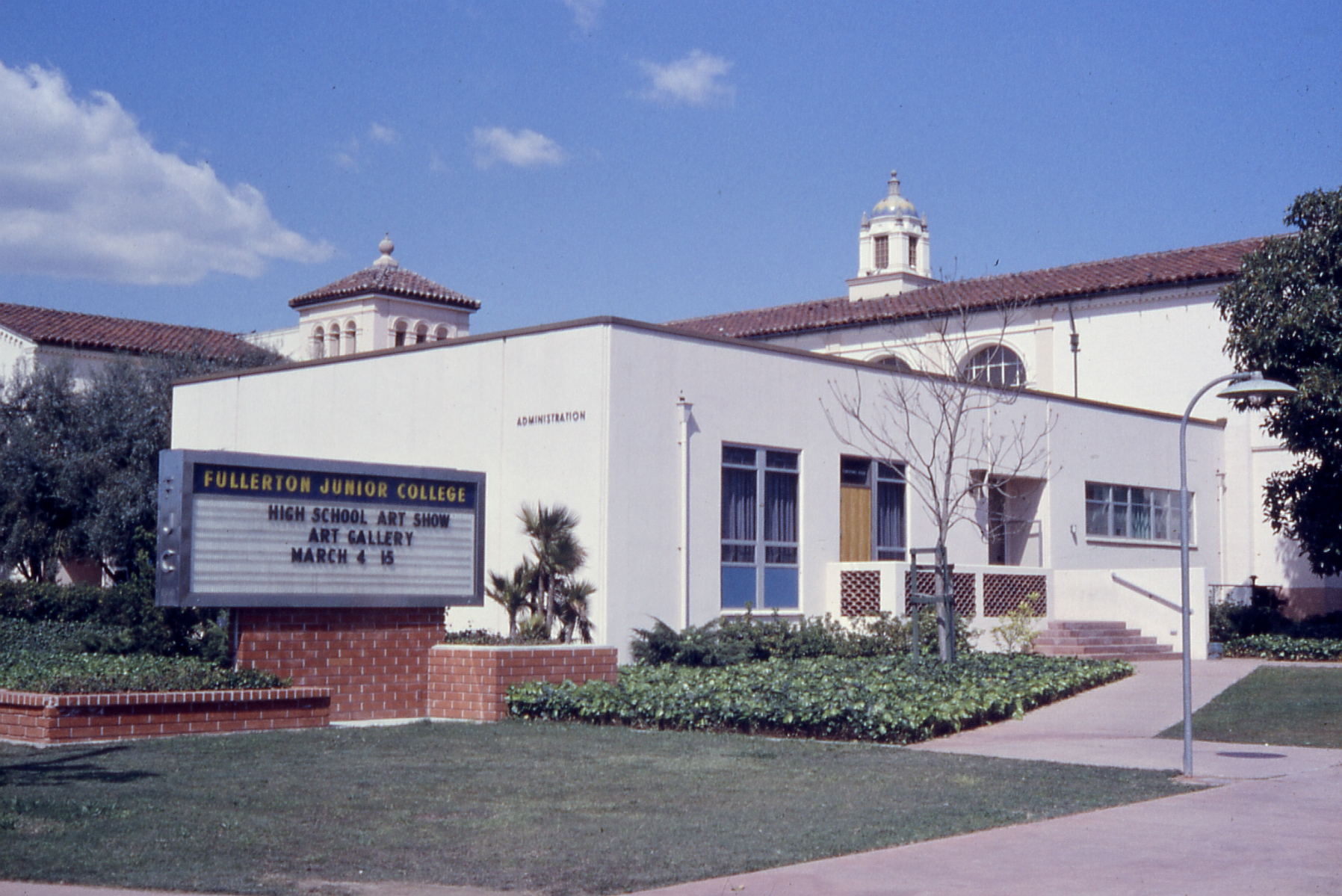
Front of the Fullerton Junior College campus, April 1963

In April 1913, the governing board of Fullerton Union High School approved a motion to establish a two-year postgraduate course of study at the high school. At this time, Fullerton was primarily an agricultural community, which specialized in the production of citrus produce. Delbert Brunton, who was the Fullerton High principal, established the new Fullerton Junior College to provide such postgraduate study.

Twenty-six freshman students enrolled in the first year, and the school had a curriculum of 10 courses. "In 1922 the college was reorganized as an independent junior college district. After holding classes on the Fullerton Union High School campus for its first 23 years, the college began moving to its own fourteen-acre campus next door in 1936."

In 2002, North Orange County voters passed a $239 million facilities bond measure, of which nearly $135 million was allotted to Fullerton College. It was used for renovation of current campus facilities and also to construct new facilities. On June 13, 2005, the new library was opened, and a formal dedication occurred on October 28, 2005. A bond measure that passed in 2014 will award the North Orange County Community College District (NOCCCD) $574 million to fund construction and renovation projects for the next 25 years.

In 2021, the college introduced an American Indian and Indigenous Studies degree program. This was announced with the school's celebration of Indigenous People's Day.

== Campus ==
The college is located in the city of Fullerton, California, in northern Orange County. The campus is within walking distance of the downtown section.

The Fullerton College library first opened in 1913, in a small section of the Fullerton High School Library. It moved into the high school gymnasium in 1929 and to a small space in the new science building in 1938. A specialized facility was constructed in 1957 and named the William T. Boyce Library in 1962 in honor of William T. Boyce, who served as dean and president from 1918 to 1951. A new library was constructed and opened on June 13, 2005, and formally dedicated on October 28, 2005.

== Artist-in-residence program ==
The Fullerton College Art Department hosts a yearly artist-in-residence (AIR) program which was started in 1972 with a visit from painter Wayne Thiebaud. August 2013 marked the 100th fall semester of the AIR program. It was celebrated with the first exhibit of the entire AIR art collection at the Fullerton College Art Gallery.

== Student life ==
Demographics of student body (spring 2019)
	Undergraduate
African-American	2.50%
American Indian	0.22%
Asian	12.25%
Filipino	2.78%
Hispanic	55.27%
Multiracial	3.12%
Pacific Islander	0.28%
Unknown	5.06%
White Non-Hispanic	18.53%

The students of Fullerton College have established a student body association named Associated Students of Fullerton College. The association is required by law to "encourage students to participate in the governance of the college".

Associated Students of Fullerton College is a voting member of a statewide community college student organization named Student Senate for California Community Colleges. The statewide Student Senate is authorized by law "to advocate before the Legislature and other state and local governmental entities".

== Notable alumni ==
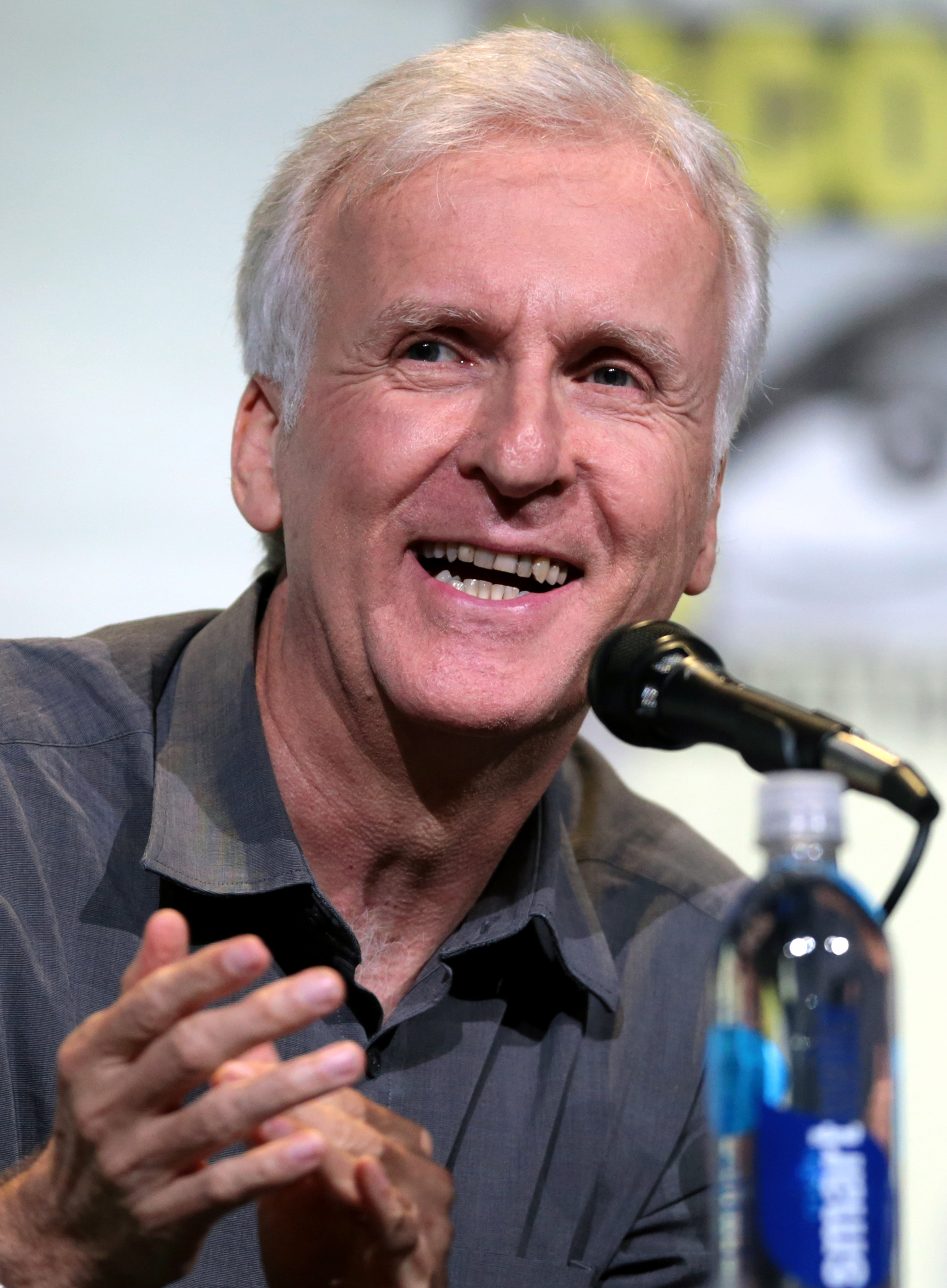
James Cameron, Academy Award-winning film director and screenwriter

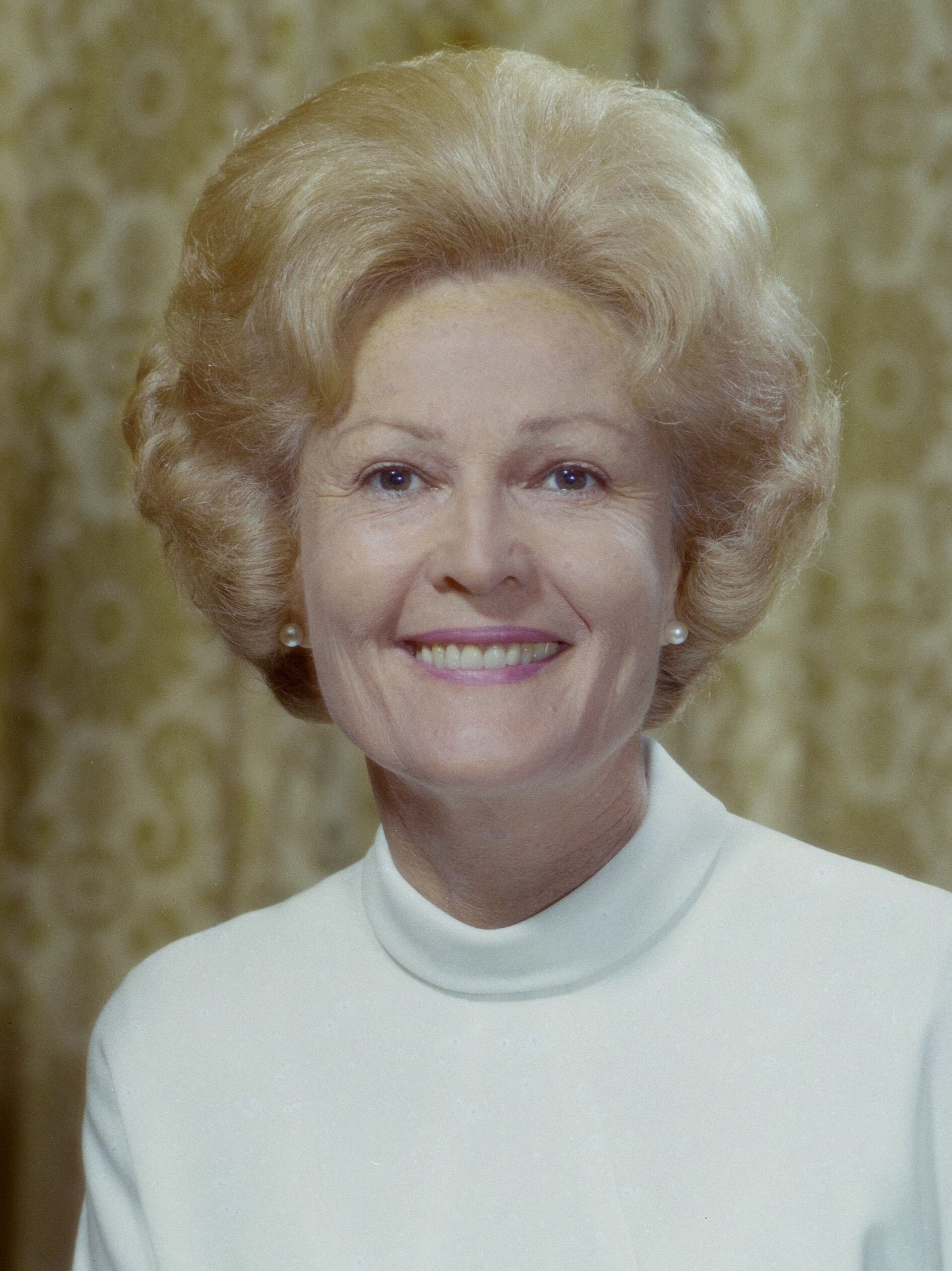
Pat Nixon, 37th First Lady of the United States

=== Actors and artists ===
- Harry Anderson – actor, comedian, and magician
- Florence Arnold – painter
- Nathan Baesel – actor
- Bill Blackbeard – writer
- James Cameron – Academy Award-winning movie director and screenwriter; explorer of the seas; attended Fullerton College 1973–1974
- William Conrad – actor, producer and director whose career spanned five decades in radio (Gunsmoke), film (The Killers) and television (Cannon)
- Eden Espinosa – actress and singer
- Ruby Berkley Goodwin – actress
- Renee Griffin – actress
- Jason Scott Lee – actor
- Matthew Lillard – actor
- Ryan O'Donohue – actor
- Mitch Pileggi – actor
- Steven Seagal – actor and martial artist
- Melissa Villaseñor – actress, comedian, and former Saturday Night Live cast member
- Cress Williams – actor, appeared in numerous TV shows including Beverly Hills, 90210, Star Trek: Deep Space Nine, NYPD Blue, ER, Becker, Nash Bridges, Providence, Black Lightning

=== Music ===
- Tim Buckley – singer-songwriter
- Jack Cooper – composer, arranger, instrumentalist
- Leo Fender – founder of the Fender Electric Instrument Manufacturing Company
- Bobby Hatfield – singer and member of The Righteous Brothers
- Scheila Gonzalez – Grammy-winning multi-instrumentalist
- Kye Palmer – trumpet player, The Tonight Show Band
- Dan Radlauer – composer
- Mark D. Sanders – songwriter
- Gwen Stefani – lead singer of band No Doubt and fashion designer

=== Politics ===
- Sallie Fiske – LGBTQ activist
- Pat Nixon – wife of former President Richard M. Nixon and First Lady of the United States 1969–1974
- Sharon Quirk-Silva – member of the California State Assembly
- Cruz Reynoso – former associate justice of the Supreme Court of California 1982–1987
- Cristian Terheș – member of the European Parliament for Romania
- Mike Wilson – member of the Kentucky Senate

=== Sports ===
- Sharron Backus – college softball player and coach
- Bill Bathe – professional baseball player
- Marvin Burns – water polo player and Olympian
- Justin Carter – professional basketball player
- Bobby Cramer – professional baseball player
- Steve DeBerg – professional football player
- Bobby Dye – college basketball player and coach
- Jim Fassel – professional football player and college football coach
- Robert Frojen – water polo player and Olympian
- Lynn Hill – climber
- Mike Horan – professional football player
- Bob Horn – water polo player and Olympian
- Al Hrabosky – professional baseball player
- Don Johnson – college basketball player and coach
- Ron Johnson – professional baseball player and manager
- Bill Johnson – Olympic swimmer
- Steve Kiefer – professional baseball player
- Howie Livingston – professional football player
- Larry Mac Duff – professional and college football coach
- Kevin McLain – professional football player
- Monte Nitzkowski – swimmer and water polo player
- Brian Noble – professional football player
- Doug Nordquist – track and field high jumper and Olympian
- Brig Owens – professional football player
- J. C. Pearson – professional football player
- John Pease – professional and college football coach
- Jerry Pimm – college basketball player and coach
- Floyd Rhea – professional football player
- Rick Sloan – track and field decathlete and Olympian
- Dan Stevens – professional baseball player
- Steve Trachsel – professional baseball player
- Dave Wilson – professional football player
- John Young – professional baseball player
