= List of Doogie Howser, M.D. episodes =

The episode list for the television series Doogie Howser, M.D., including descriptions, given in broadcast order on its original network ABC. There are a total of 97 episodes produced and broadcast among its four seasons from September 20, 1989, to March 24, 1993.

== Series overview ==
Season	Episodes	Originally released		Rank	Rating
Season	Episodes	First released	Last released	Rank	Rating
1	26	September 19, 1989	May 2, 1990	28	14.5 (Note: Tied with The Simpsons and Night Court)
2	25	September 12, 1990	May 1, 1991	24	14.7
3	24	September 25, 1991	May 13, 1992	34	12.9
4	22	September 23, 1992	March 24, 1993	57	10.2

== Episodes ==
=== Season 1 (1989–1990) ===
No. overall	No. in season	Title	Directed by	Written by	Original release date	Prod. code	Viewers (millions)
1	1	"Pilot"	Rick Wallace	Steven Bochco & David E. Kelley	September 19, 1989	1101	31.7
Dr. Douglas "Doogie" Howser takes the test to get his driver's license and helps a victim of a car accident. Doogie had to go through a tough lesson about being a doctor when he lost his first patient.
2	2	"The Ice Queen Cometh"	Betty Thomas	Linda Morris & Vic Rauseo	September 20, 1989	1103	21.5
Victoria Burke (Elyssa Davalos), the beautiful new chief of radiology wants Doogie's genes to have a child. Doogie misunderstands her offer and is worried she is asking him to sleep with her.
3	3	"A Stitch Called Wanda"	Rick Wallace	Steven Bochco & David E. Kelley	September 27, 1989	1102	22.6
Doogie performs an operation in violation of hospital policy. It also causes tension between him and Wanda, since he had to do a pelvic exam before diagnosing her with an appendicitis.
4	4	"Frisky Business"	Johanna Demetrakas	Nat Berntein & Mitchel Lee Katlin	October 4, 1989	1104	23.7
Vinnie convinces Doogie to throw a party while his parents are away. Doogie drinks a beer at the party and is later arrested while on the way to the hospital for an emergency.
5	5	"The Short Goodbye"	Rob Thompson	Phil Kellard & Tom Moore	October 11, 1989	1105	23.5
Doogie, feeling that he is unjustly treated by his parents, moves out of the house, but due to his lack of credit he can only lease a room at a flophouse. Vinnie, in an attempt to meet the rock star Charmagne (Nana Visitor), poses as Doogie.
6	6	"Simply Irresistible"	Sheldon Larry	Story by : Michael Lazarou; Teleplay by : Nat Berntein & Mitchel Lee Katlin and Michael Lazarou	October 18, 1989	1107	23.5
After spending over forty hours in the hospital, missing a concert with Wanda, and feeling under-appreciated at the hospital, Doogie considers an offer from an upscale Brentwood pediatric private practice.
7	7	"Vinnie Video Vici"	Sandy Smolan	Linda Morris & Vic Rauseo	October 25, 1989	1108	23.9
The hospital agrees to let Vinnie film a documentary about Doogie. However, his annoying techniques and intrusive behavior annoy Doogie who must tell a family that their daughter (Thora Birch) might have cancer.
8	8	"Blood and Remembrance"	Matthew Diamond	Jill Gordon	November 1, 1989	1106	21.8
Doogie and Wanda break up after learning that Wanda went on a date with another guy. A man needs a blood transfusion from his wife that he is divorcing.
9	9	"She Ain't Heavy, She's My Cousin"	Stephen Cragg	Phil Kellard & Tom Moore	November 8, 1989	1109	22.5
Vinnie goes on a date with Yvette (Lesley Boone), Wanda's obese cousin. Vinnie gets along with her, which surprises him. Doogie treats a woman (Anne Bloom) who is obsessed with plastic surgery, and is bothered by it. Both boys learn about dealing with people who have problems with appearance.
10	10	"My Old Man and the Sea"	Gabrielle Beaumont	Nat Berntein & Mitchel Lee Katlin	November 15, 1989	1111	21.4
Doogie reluctantly accompanies David, his father, on their annual fishing trip after being invited to Palm Springs with Wanda and her family.
11	11	"Tonight's the Night"	Rob Thompson	Linda Morris & Vic Rauseo	November 22, 1989	1112	17.8
At the hospital, Doogie treats Caroline (Terri Ivens), a seventeen-year-old girl who gives birth and then abandons the baby, leaving the child on Doogie's doorstep. Doogie and Wanda decide that they should take the big step in their relationship and have sex, but his experience with Caroline causes him to think twice.
12	12	"Every Dog Has His Doogie"	Sheldon Larry	Phil Kellard & Tom Moore	November 29, 1989	1113	22.6
After being angered over the hospital refusing to admit a homeless man, Doogie operates on a dog using hospital resources to prove his point. This causes him to run afoul of his superiors, as well as his father, who warns being a doctor does not instantly grant one knowledge of all biology.
13	13	"Doogie the Red-Nosed Reindeer"	Betty Thomas	Jill Gordon	December 13, 1989	1110	24.0
Doogie is forced to work a shift on Christmas Eve, despite pressure from Vinnie to go to a party.
14	14	"Greed Is Good"	Johanna Demetrakas	Jill Gordon	January 3, 1990	1114	24.3
Doogie wins on a game show and advances to the finals, but everyone encouraging him to use his knowledge to win big bucks and fancy prizes is bothering his conscience. His sole sober perspective is from an elderly black patient of his who had been a boxer in the 1950s, giving Doogie insight on the true meaning of victory.
15	15	"Attack of the Green-Eyed Monster"	Rob Thompson	Nat Berntein & Mitchel Lee Katlin	January 10, 1990	1115	23.0
A former female patient Krista (Josie Bissett) makes a pass at Doogie, making Wanda jealous. Doogie's parents stop talking to each other over a problem with flirting.
16	16	"It Ain't Over Till Mrs. Howser Sings"	Stephen Cragg	Linda Morris & Vic Rauseo	January 17, 1990	1116	20.5
After having a breast cancer scare, Doogie's mom, Katherine, takes a new job singing at a nightclub. Both Katherine's husband and son are surprised by this turn of events, and try to convince her appreciating life is not always doing wild things.
17	17	"Tough Guys Don't Teach"	Charles Haid	Michael Swerdlick	January 31, 1990	1118	23.1
Doogie goes back to high school to teach sex education and ends up fighting a school jock after school.
18	18	"I Never Sold Shower Heads for My Father"	Bruce Green	Phil Kellard & Tom Moore	February 7, 1990	1117	20.1
Vinnie's father, Carmine (Don Calfa), wants Vinnie to get into the showerhead family business, but Vinnie is recalcitrant, saying he wishes to be a filmmaker. When Carmine is rushed to the hospital one day after suffering a moderate infarction, he reveals he knew about his heart problems but hid them out of concern, and Vinny shows his father some of his amateur films; test commercials for Delpino showerheads.
19	19	"Doogie's Awesome, Excellent Adventure"	David Carson	Jill Gordon	February 14, 1990	1119	20.7
After saving a popular guy's life, Doogie gets new cool friends and forgets about Vinnie. Doogie takes David's car to go a party he was invited to by the popular guy, with the car later being towed away.
20	20	"Use a Slurpy, Go to Jail"	Michael Fresco	Nat Berntein & Mitchel Lee Katlin	February 28, 1990	1120	23.3
Vinnie takes a job in convenience store. When Doogie makes a milk run, the store gets robbed by Raymond, a.k.a. Z-Man (Markus Redmond), a gang member from Compton. The botched robbery soon becomes a police standoff, with Doogie trying to convince Z-Man to do the right thing and surrender. Doogie and Vinnie make friends with Raymond and also learn what it is like to be him and why he is doing this.
21	21	"Whose Mid-Life Crisis Is It Anyway?"	Rob Thompson	Michael Swerdlick	March 14, 1990	1121	21.4
David decides to quit his medical practice, after learning that the medical thesis that he worked for years on has already been done.
22	22	"Vinnie's Blind Date"	Scott Goldstein	Linda Morris & Vic Rauseo	March 25, 1990	1122	22.7
Vinnie romances Bernadette Callen (Amanda Peterson), a blind girl that Doogie introduced him to at the hospital. Vinnie later fears that Bernadette will lose interest in him, once she gets her eyesight back.
23	23	"And the Winner Is..."	Charles Haid	Phil Kellard & Tom Moore	March 28, 1990	1123	21.8
Doogie and Jack hear a rumor that they are both in the running for Resident of the Year, forcing the two doctors to compete against each other.
24	24	"Breaking Up Is Hard to Doogie"	Kevin Hooks	Nat Berntein & Mitchel Lee Katlin	April 4, 1990	1124	22.3
Realizing that his relationship with Wanda has stalled, Doogie ponders whether to break it off.
25	25	"The Grass Ain't Always Greener"	Rob Thompson	Michael Swerdlick	April 25, 1990	1125	21.3
Fresh off his breakup with Wanda, Doogie scores a date with a Lakers cheerleader and contemplates spending the night with her.
26	26	"Frankly, My Dear, I Don't Give a Grand"	Stephen Cragg	Nick Harding	May 2, 1990	1126	18.8
Vinnie comes down with tonsillitis, on the same night he planned on losing his virginity to Janine. Wanda tells Doogie that she is spending the summer in Europe with a male student and Doogie does not take the news well.

=== Season 2 (1990–91) ===
No. overall	No. in season	Title	Directed by	Written by	Original release date	Prod. code	Viewers (millions)
27	1	"Doogenstein"	Eric Laneuville	Linda Morris & Vic Rauseo	September 12, 1990	1202	23.2
Doogie realizes that he is missing out on his life because of his job after being called to the hospital during his seventeenth-birthday party.
28	2	"Guess Who's Coming to Doogie's"	Stephen Cragg	Nat Berntein & Mitchel Lee Katlin	September 19, 1990	1201	25.1
Raymond, a.k.a. Z-Man, the robber who held Doogie and Vinnie hostage previously before becoming friends with them, has been released from prison and Doogie invites him to dinner, but Katherine is still upset over the crime. Doogie then get Raymond an orderly job at the hospital, which does not go smoothly.
29	3	"Ask Dr. Doogie"	Win Phelps	Phil Kellard & Tom Moore	September 26, 1990	1204	23.8
Doogie becomes an instant celebrity after he appears in MTV-influenced public service announcements. His fame soon starts to interfere with his work, when he is trying to find a bone marrow match for Candace (Mayim Bialik), a cancer patient.
30	4	"C'est la Vinnie"	Joan Darling	Michael Swerdlick	October 3, 1990	1205	24.4
Vinnie ends up stuck in an elevator with his pregnant French teacher (Mimi Kuzyk).
31	5	"Car Wars"	Brad Silberling	Nick Harding	October 10, 1990	1207	25.9
Doogie argues with his dad over whether he can buy a 1957 Chevrolet convertible. Doogie must convince a mentally disabled man to seek treatment.
32	6	"Doogie Sings the Blues"	Eric Laneuville	Story by : Nat Bernstein & Mitchel Lee Katlin and Linda Morris & Vic Rauseo; Teleplay by : Michael B. Kaplan	October 17, 1990	1208	22.9
Doogie treats Blind Otis Lemon (Joe Seneca), a legendary blues player, who needs surgery to remove a tumor. However, the after-effects of the surgery may leave the man deaf.
33	7	"Academia Nuts"	Ed Sherin	Nick Harding	October 24, 1990	1203	26.1
After stealing an old biology paper of Doogie's and getting caught by Doogie soon after, Vinnie decides to drop out of high school. Dr. Canfield asks that Doogie lie to Beatrice Portmeyer (Carol Bruce) a hypochondriac woman, who is rich and has given generously to the hospital in the past and is willing to give the hospital more money based on how satisfactory her service is.
34	8	"Revenge of the Teenage Dead"	Win Phelps	Nat Berntein & Mitchel Lee Katlin	October 31, 1990	1209	21.6
Doogie assesses Gregory Pelzman (Christopher Pettiet), a thirteen-year-old prodigy to determine if he is a good candidate for medical school. Doogie then tries to convince Gregory to enjoy life as a kid. Vinnie attempts to make a horror movie, then chooses Gregory to star in it.
35	9	"Nautilus for Naught"	Matia Karrell	Nick Harding & Tara Ison & Neil Landau	November 7, 1990	1211	23.2
Doogie feels uncomfortable when Wanda takes a living art class with Greg (Jason Brooks), a nude model, with Wanda later setting up a date with Greg. The hospital holds its annual bachelor auction with Doogie participating for the first time. Doogie treats Sasha Larkin (Martha Byrne), a fashion model whose career is on the wane and is resorting to bulimia.
36	10	"Don't Let the Turkeys Get You Down"	David Carson	Nick Harding	November 14, 1990	1214	23.9
Katherine's parents Don and Irene (Tim O'Connor and Gloria Henry) come to visit for Thanksgiving, with Don still being resentful of David, due to Katherine and David's fifteen-year age difference. Vinnie is offended by Janine's family and Janine herself, for her family making her dump Vinnie for a new car, with Janine strongly considering getting the car.
37	11	"Oh Very Young"	Joan Darling	Linda Morris & Vic Rauseo	November 28, 1990	1210	24.1
Doogie is chosen as one of five doctors to work with a highly respected reconstructive surgeon; however, the surgeon has other ideas. Nurse Spaulding and Dr. Canfield go out on a date, puzzling everyone else around them.
38	12	"TV or Not TV"	Joan Tewkesbury	Phil Kellard & Tom Moore	December 5, 1990	1212	21.7
Vinnie poses as an orderly to try and meet Bradford Eisner (Jeff McCarthy), the head of ABC television who is staying at the hospital, wanting Mr. Eisner to give him a letter of recommendation for New York University.
39	13	"A Woman Too Far"	Victoria Hochberg	Phil Kellard & Tom Moore	December 12, 1990	1206	20.4
Doogie is attracted to Lisa (Heather McAdam), a nursing student who he asks out behind Wanda's back. Doogie learns that a trucker (Michael McManus) with stomach pains caused by stress has two wives (Candice Azzara and Patty McCormack) and two families, unbeknownst to each other.
40	14	"Presumed Guilty"	Stephen Cragg	Phil Kellard & Tom Moore	January 2, 1991	1215	23.2
Vinnie takes Doogie's car out for a spin, and it gets smashed by a falling piano. Doogie and Vinnie get into even more trouble by not telling David. A college basketball player with spine problems, who is also a friend of Raymond's, refuses medical attention, thinking it will ruin his chances of going pro.
41	15	"To Live and Die in Brentwood"	Scott Goldstein	Nat Berntein & Mitchel Lee Katlin	January 9, 1991	1213	28.0
When her mother dies in a car accident, Wanda keeps her distance from Doogie. Wondering about his own death, Vinnie creates a video will and testament.
42	16	"Air Doogie"	Rob Thompson	Nat Berntein & Mitchel Lee Katlin	January 23, 1991	1217	22.5
Doogie fakes an injury so he does not have to play in an exhibition basketball game against a rival hospital. Guilty over his actions, he hallucinates seeing pro basketball player Julius Erving. Raymond flirts with Trish Andrews (Jada Pinkett), a patient admitted for leg surgery, who has no interest in him whatsoever.
43	17	"A Life in Progress"	Sandy Smolan	Hollis Rich	January 30, 1991	1216	21.0
Jeff Moore (Robert Clohessy), an artist with AIDS, is hired to decorate a mural inside the children's center. However, the revelation of his disease has parents pulling their children from working with him.
44	18	"My Two Dads"	Bill D'Elia	Nick Harding	February 6, 1991	1218	22.3
Feeling neglected by his own father, Vinnie convinces Doogie and David to take him on their annual fishing trip.
45	19	"Nobody Expects the Spanish Inquisition"	Stephen Cragg	Nick Harding	February 13, 1991	1220	23.0
Katherine's parents make an unannounced visit with Katherine's father Don driving the kitchen contractor away. It leaves Don, Doogie and Vinnie to complete the kitchen work, which Doogie is less than thrilled about. Doogie tells a couple with a family history of miscarriages that they are having a baby.
46	20	"Fatal Distraction"	Gabrielle Beaumont	Phil Kellard & Tom Moore	February 20, 1991	1219	18.1
Still grieving over the death of her mother, Wanda has no time to go out with Doogie, so they break up. Doogie uses the opportunity to ask out Michele Faber (Robyn Lively), a new nursing student.
47	21	"The Doctor, the Wife, Her Son and the Job"	Brad Silberling	Hollis Rich	March 13, 1991	1221	22.2
Katherine takes a job as a patient advocate at the hospital, unintentionally causing Doogie embarrassment.
48	22	"Planet of the Dateless"	Kristoffer Siegel-Tabori	Nat Berntein & Mitchel Lee Katlin	March 20, 1991	1222	23.2
After spending two weeks in Mexico helping less fortunate patients, Jack decides to resign from the Eastman practice, to become flying physician. Doogie desperately scrambles to get a date for the Eastman dance, later meeting Sara Newman (Carla Gugino), a woman who has the same interests as Jack. Note: Final appearance of Dr. Jack McGuire (Mitchell Anderson)
49	23	"Doogie's Wager"	Charles Haid	Hollis Rich	April 3, 1991	1224	21.4
Vinnie is nervous about possibly not getting accepted into film school. Doogie is happy that a couple is finally having a baby after many attempts, however the baby is born premature. Raymond graduates from high school.
50	24	"A Kiss Ain't Just a Kiss"	Scott Goldstein	Story by : Linda Morris & Vic Rauseo; Teleplay by : Nat Berntein & Mitchel Lee Katlin and Nick Harding	April 24, 1991	1225	22.8
After Vinnie cheats on Janine by going out with Phyllis Maldarelli (Jennifer Gatti), an attractive classmate, Janine goes to Doogie to be consoled, they then kiss. Raymond refuses to forgive his father (Michael D. Roberts), who walked out on him and his mother years ago.
51	25	"Dances with Wanda"	Steve Robman	Phil Kellard & Tom Moore	May 1, 1991	1223	18.5
Vinnie and Janine convince Doogie to ask Wanda to the prom, despite Wanda being uninterested. Kelly (Linda Larkin), an aspiring photojournalist awaiting a heart transplant, impresses Doogie by her will to keep living.

=== Season 3 (1991–92) ===
No. overall	No. in season	Title	Directed by	Written by	Original release date	Prod. code	Viewers (millions)
52	1	"The Summer of '91"	Stephen Cragg	Linda Morris & Vic Rauseo	September 25, 1991	1305	25.9
Doogie turns eighteen and feels it is finally time to lose his virginity to Wanda, before she leaves town for college. A woman with a mental condition thinks that Doogie is her deceased husband.
53	2	"Doogie Has Left the Building: Part 1"	Eric Laneuville	Hollis Rich	October 2, 1991	1301	22.2
Doogie and Vinnie get an apartment together. Doogie ponders a decision involving a couple with their son who has cancer and the pregnancy of their second child. Doogie's parents are dealing with empty nest syndrome.
54	3	"Doogie Has Left the Building: Part 2"	Eric Laneuville	Nat Berntein & Mitchel Lee Katlin	October 9, 1991	1302	22.8
Doogie and Vinnie's living arrangements begin to strain. Doogie moves ahead with a surgical procedure on a young boy with cancer and the involvement of boy's sibling who is about to be born.
55	4	"It's a Darn Shaman"	Win Phelps	Nick Harding	October 16, 1991	1303	21.9
Janine's family forbids her to see Vinnie. After speaking with Doogie's parents, about how they eloped, Janine tells Vinnie she wants to elope as well. A Laotian family's religious beliefs jeopardize Doogie's care of a disabled youth.
56	5	"The Cheese Stands Alone"	Stephen Cragg	Nat Berntein & Mitchel Lee Katlin	October 23, 1991	1310	21.8
Janine reveals to Doogie that she was date raped before moving to Brentwood, effecting her relationship with Vinnie, who wants their relationship to reach the sexual level. A seductive classmate in Vinnie's drama class expresses her attraction to him, with Vinnie thinking about giving in.
57	6	"Lonesome Doog"	Win Phelps	Eileen Heisler & DeAnn Heline	October 30, 1991	1304	21.8
Wanda comes home from art school and a handsome guy from her school meets up with her, which rubs Doogie the wrong way. Wanda and Doogie officially break up for good and decide to become good friends.
58	7	"When Doogie Comes Marching Home"	Joe Ann Fogle	Story by : Nick Harding & Gareth Wootton; Teleplay by : Nick Harding	November 13, 1991	1307	18.9
Doogie unintentionally insults David, after the two disagree on the importance of bedside manner. Doogie and Vinnie disagree on an American Civil War-inspired screenplay that the two are collaborating on.
59	8	"Doogstruck"	Brad Silberling	Ellen Herman	November 20, 1991	1306	21.3
While driving to visit Wanda in Chicago, Doogie's car breaks down in the desert, where he meets Shannon (Danielle von Zerneck), an attractive astronomy enthusiast.
60	9	"Room and Broad"	Charles Haid	Nick Harding	November 27, 1991	1311	17.2
Doogie's parents want him to pay room and board. Doogie helps a young nurse overcome her fear of blood. Curly's father (Paul Lambert), refuses to take medicine so that he may live longer.
61	10	"Doogiesomething"	Joan Darling	Hollis Rich	December 4, 1991	1309	20.1
Doogie and Wanda's efforts to be friends are tested, when Wanda asks for Doogie's advice on spending the weekend with another guy.
62	11	"Truth and Consequences"	Charles Haid	Hollis Rich	December 11, 1991	1313	19.6
Doogie takes a liking to Cecilia (Perrey Reeves), the hospital research librarian, only after he learns she is scheduled for rhinoplasty. Raymond's old mentor (Kene Holliday) has a rare cerebral condition and refuses treatment.
63	12	"It's a Wonderful Laugh"	Scott Goldstein	Story by : Eric Gilliland; Teleplay by : Eric Gilliland & Nick Harding & Ellen Herman	December 18, 1991	1308	21.0
Doogie and Vinnie argue, after Doogie belittles Vinnie's interest in comedic films. Doogie tries to cheer up a boy patient by watching The Three Stooges.
64	13	"Dangerous Reunions"	Eric Lanueville	Ellen Herman	January 8, 1992	1312	21.2
Katherine relives her past by reuniting with her old band from her college days. Wally (Christopher Allport), a member of that band who Katherine also dated, reignites Katherine's old romantic feelings which concerns Doogie. After failing a test to become an emergency medical technician, Raymond falls back in with gang members from his old neighborhood.
65	14	"Mummy Dearest"	Charles Haid	Ellen Herman	January 22, 1992	1316	16.9
The examination of a mummy spurs talk of a curse among the staff. The mummy shows a strange resemblance to Vinnie, convincing him the curse really exists.
66	15	"Double Doogie with Cheese"	Bill D'Elia	Hollis Rich	February 5, 1992	1318	21.1
Vinnie bets that Doogie cannot last in a "mindless" fast-food job under the scrutiny of their boss Mr. L'Amour (Andrew Hill Newman). If Doogie fails he has to give up his CD player to Vinnie.
67	16	"The Show Mustn't Go On"	Scott Goldstein	Nat Berntein & Mitchel Lee Katlin	February 12, 1992	1314	16.4
Rick O'Neill (David James Elliot), an egotistical actor observes Doogie's hospital procedures to make his TV series more popular.
68	17	"If This Is Adulthood, I'd Rather Be in Philadelphia"	Stephen Cragg	Nat Berntein & Mitchel Lee Katlin	February 19, 1992	1317	15.4
Doogie discovers what Cecilia has been hiding — Matthew (Miko Hughes), her four-year-old son.
69	18	"What You See Ain't Necessarily What You Get"	Scott Goldstein	Hollis Rich	March 11, 1992	1322	19.7
After taking Curly out for her thirtieth birthday, Doogie wonders about having a romantic relationship with her. Doogie clashes with Dr. Elena Spencer (Maggie Jakobson), an opinionated medical student.
70	19	"My Father, Myself"	Gabrielle Beaumont	Eileen Heisler & DeAnn Heline	March 18, 1992	1319	21.1
Doogie reconsiders career specialties and considers joining David's practice. Doogie then looks back at his younger days when he first thought of joining his father's practice.
71	20	"Educating Janine"	Joan Darling	Nick Harding	April 1, 1992	1315	21.0
Janine decides to drop out of college to pursue a career in fashion. After Katherine gives Janine advice on her situation, Katherine is then blamed by Janine's parents for their child's sudden path.
72	21	"Son of the Desert"	Joe Ann Fogle	Story by : Hollis Rich; Teleplay by : Nick Harding & Ellen Herman	April 22, 1992	1324	17.1
Doogie considers a fellowship in trauma surgery. Doogie and Vinnie head for Palm Springs after seeing Janine partying on television for spring break. While at Palm Springs, Doogie courts a girl who is a paraplegic.
73	22	"That's What Friends Are For"	Michael Fresco	Ellen Herman	April 29, 1992	1321	14.5
Wanda comes home after her dad Michael (Bill Hudson) announces he is going to sell the house and Doogie is anything but popular after he encourages her to accept her dad's new fiancé Dr. Julie Ross (Katherine Cannon). Vinnie tries nearly everything to increase his height after a hand x-ray reveals that his bones have fused. Note: Final Appearance of Wanda Plenn (Lisa Dean Ryan)
74	23	"Thanks for the Memories"	David Carson	Nat Berntein & Mitchel Lee Katlin	May 6, 1992	1323	16.2
Cherished memories get lost in the aging process for an elderly patient (Nehemiah Persoff) who relies on Doogie to help him remember.
75	24	"Club Medicine"	Mark Horowitz	Nick Harding	May 13, 1992	1320	15.3
Doogie and David spend their annual father-son trip at a Honduran operating theater as a part of a Doctors Without Borders program.

=== Season 4 (1992–93) ===
No. overall	No. in season	Title	Directed by	Written by	Original release date	Prod. code	Viewers (millions)
76	1	"There's a Riot Going On"	Eric Laneuville	Nick Harding	September 23, 1992	1404	15.4
The 1992 L.A. riots overwhelm the Eastman staff's work schedule. Vinnie is left watching over children whose daycare was trashed in the riot.
77	2	"Look Ma, No Pants"	Joan Tewkesbury	Nat Berntein & Mitchel Lee Katlin	September 30, 1992	1402	17.3
Katherine cannot stop playing mother to Doogie. Doogie dates Katherine's boss and he brings her over for skinny dipping. Doogie considers moving out.
78	3	"Doogie Got a Gun"	Stephen Cragg	P.K. Simonds, Jr.	October 7, 1992	1407	15.5
After being held at gunpoint at his own doorstep, Doogie considers buying a gun, but he is haunted by memories of shooting victims that he has treated in the past.
79	4	"Doogie Doesn't Live Here Anymore"	Win Phelps	Linda Morris & Vic Rauseo	October 14, 1992	1408	16.1
Doogie buys a run-down Venice loft, angering David, who wanted him to buy an affluent condo. Vinnie has to deal with his parents getting a divorce and moving to different places.
80	5	"The Patient in Spite of Himself"	Win Phelps	Hollis Rich	October 21, 1992	1401	14.6
A med-school project has Doogie and Dr. Spencer posing as patients. While videotaping the arrangements for an engaged couple's wedding, Vinnie becomes attracted to the bride (Emily Warfield).
81	6	"To Err is Human, to Give Up Isn't a Bad Idea"	Scott Goldstein	Nat Berntein & Mitchel Lee Katlin	October 28, 1992	1410	17.9
Doogie experiences pressure leading his first surgical procedure. Vinnie does not know whom to vote for in the 1992 presidential election.
82	7	"Doogie, Can You Hear Me?"	Joe Ann Fogle	Elaine Aronson	November 11, 1992	1406	16.0
A hearing-impaired patient charms Doogie, who speaks her language by signing. Doogie then tries to convince her to get a cochlear implant procedure. Vinnie has a tough time coming up with a subject for a student film for his sophomore year at film school.
83	8	"Nothing Compares 2 U"	Rachel Feldman	Barry Gurstein & David Pitlik	November 11, 1992	1405	17.8
Doogie's ego takes a beating when Laura (Eva Loseth), a beautiful nurse, chooses Vinnie over him. Raymond has a hard time doing his job after being promoted to an EMT.
84	9	"Do the Right Thing, If You Can Figure Out What It Is"	Win Phelps	P.K. Simonds, Jr.	November 18, 1992	1411	21.5
Doogie must choose the best candidate for a heart transplant, along with the fact that the patient that Doogie is vouching for, who is receiving the heart, has difficulty giving up smoking. Janine visits Vinnie, finally wanting to make love to him, however Vinnie begins to have second thoughts.
85	10	"The Big Sleep ... Not!"	Stephen Cragg	Elaine Aronson	November 25, 1992	1412	13.7
With his parents on vacation, Doogie spends most of the time in hospital in the days leading up to Thanksgiving. Vinnie stays over at Doogie's place, after days of him not getting a good night's sleep. Mrs. Fukes (Gail Edwards), a mother who recently gave birth to her third child, does not yet want to return to her stressful home.
86	11	"Will the Real Dr. Howser Please Stand Up?"	Kenneth Frankel	David Greenwalt	December 9, 1992	1403	14.9
Doogie spots evidence of child abuse when his dad's friend brings in his injured son for care. Vinnie encourages Doogie to try a video dating service.
87	12	"The Mother of All Fishing Trips"	Mark Horowitz	P.K. Simonds, Jr.	December 16, 1992	1415	13.1
Katherine takes Doogie fishing when David throws his back out. Vinnie takes care of David while Doogie and Katherine are away.
88	13	"Roommate with a View"	Joan Tewkesbury	Nat Berntein & Mitchel Lee Katlin	December 30, 1992	1418	14.6
Doogie learns a lesson about trusting the unknown from a free-spirited model, who is sharing his loft for a few days. Bert (James Pickens, Jr.), a man in need of a kidney, is offered one by Jerry (Dirk Blocker), a fishing partner he hardly knows.
89	14	"Spell It... 'M-A-N!'"	Bill D'Elia	Nick Harding	January 6, 1993	1413	15.1
Doogie begins dating Nurse Michele Faber again. Michele then retaliates against Doogie's braggadocio by spreading rumors about him. Vinnie moves in with Mark (Gil Cates, Jr.), a fellow film student, who has available space in his dorm room, only to find out that Mark is gay, which makes Vinnie feel uncomfortable.
90	15	"It's a Tough Job ... But Why Does My Father Have to Do It?"	Bobby Houston	Nick Harding	January 13, 1993	1409	16.3
David is asked to take the job of the new Head of Family Medicine, replacing Dr. Brian Horshlower (Patrick Cronin) who died during his lunch break. Vinnie refuses to accept his father's new girlfriend.
91	16	"The Adventures of Sherlock Howser"	Paul Robert Newman	Elaine Aronson	January 20, 1993	1416	13.0
Doogie as Sherlock Holmes and Vinnie as Doctor Watson play out Doogie's confusion over Michele dating other men while still seeing Doogie. Curly announces her engagement, but has some hesitation about committing.
92	17	"Love Means Constantly Having to Say You're Sorry"	Craig Belknap	Nat Berntein & Mitchel Lee Katlin	January 27, 1993	1414	N/A
Vinnie finally loses his virginity to Laura; he later reacts with jealousy to men around her. Doogie treats beautiful Kelly Phillips (Tracy Scoggins), a famous actress/philanthropist who comes down with a mysterious illness.
93	18	"You've Come a Long Way, Babysitter"	Mark Horowitz	Nick Harding	February 3, 1993	1421	14.6
Rachel Miller (Chelsea Noble), Doogie's old babysitter and crush, visits him, with Doogie's old fantasies about her finally coming true. Vinnie tries to get Nathan Gage (Jeff Yagher), a big-time actor, to read his script.
94	19	"Love Makes the World Go 'Round...or Is It Money?"	Scott Goldstein	Story by : Nat Berntein & Mitchel Lee Katlin; Teleplay by : P.K. Simonds, Jr.	February 24, 1993	1422	14.6
A deposit error dumping $16,000 in Vinnie's account tests his integrity. Molly Harris (Shiri Appleby), a preteen patient, develops a crush on Doogie.
95	20	"Dorky Housecall, M.D."	David Carson	Nick Harding	March 10, 1993	1417	15.2
Doogie treats Hank Bellamy (John Vernon), a cartoonist who has been lampooning him as "Dr. Dorky Housecall". While he ignores the teasing at first, the cartoons create tension with him and Michelle.
96	21	"Eleven Angry People...and Vinnie"	Joe Ann Fogle	P.K. Simonds, Jr.	March 17, 1993	1419	13.4
Jury member Vinnie tries to look beyond the letter of the law when a young man is put on trial for assaulting his employer. Doogie learns that a senior doctor, Emmitt Randall (Alan Young), is actually a fraud.
97	22	"What Makes Doogie Run"	Dennis Dugan	Elaine Aronson	March 24, 1993	1420	13.4
Doogie and Vinnie take acting classes. Doogie seeks inspiration outside the world of medicine and decides to travel to Rome with Vinnie.
