= Westchester Enriched Sciences Magnets =

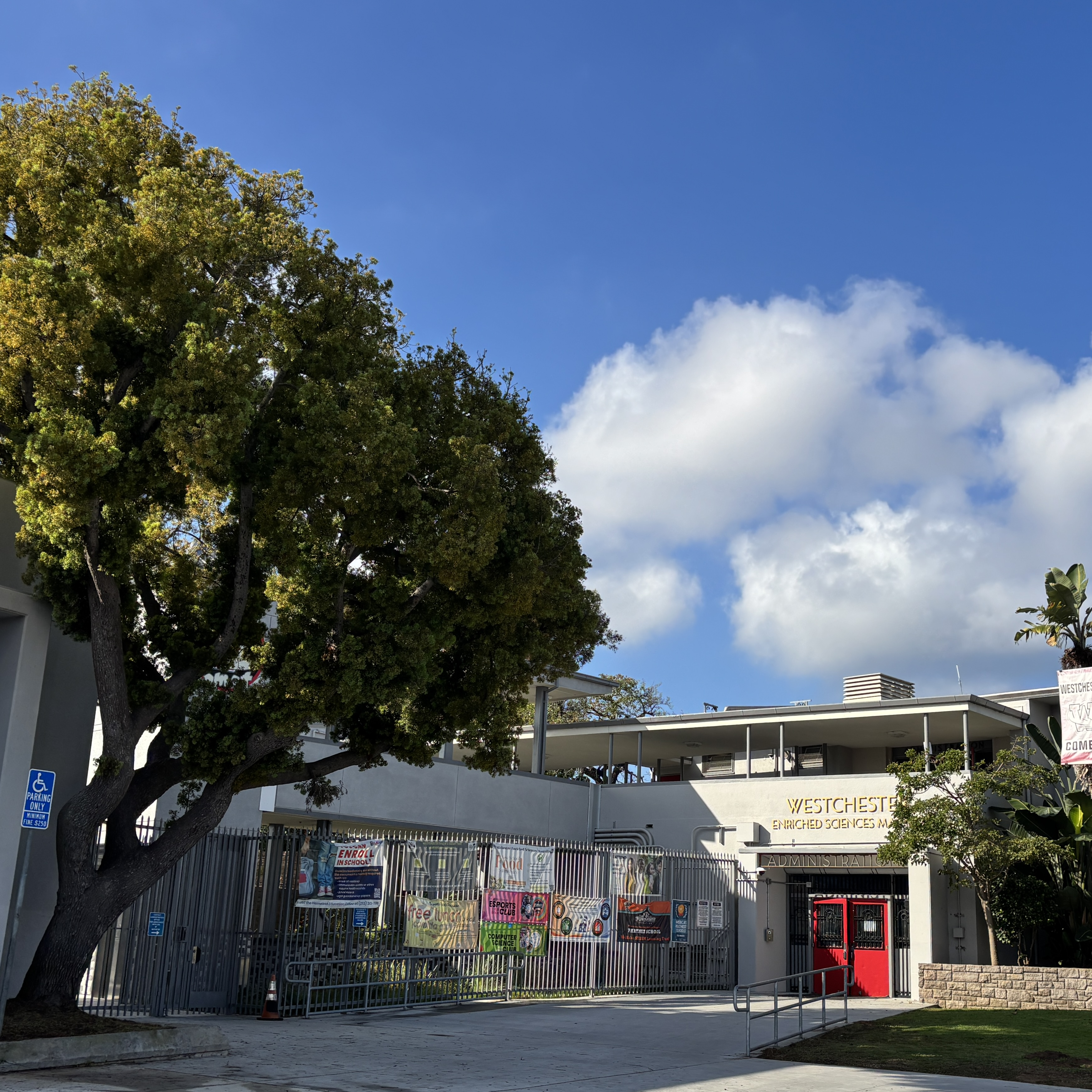

Location
- 7400 West Manchester Avenue; Los Angeles, California 90045; United States; 33°57′30″N 118°25′43″W

Information
- Type: Public school
- Motto: The Future of Scientific Thought... Today
- Established: 1957
- School district: Los Angeles Unified School District
- Principal: Janet Mack
- Faculty: 100
- Teaching staff: 43.96 (FTE)
- Enrollment: 899 (2018-19)
- Student to teacher ratio: 20.45
- Campus: Suburban Los Angeles International Airport
- Colors: Red, Black, and White
- Athletics conference: CIF Los Angeles City Section; Western League
- Mascot: Chester the Comet & Chester the Dog
- Nickname: Comets
- Website: westchesterhs.lausd.org

Westchester Enriched Sciences Magnets (WESM) is a magnet high school in the Los Angeles Unified School District, West Region. It is located in Westchester (Los Angeles), a neighborhood adjacent to Los Angeles International Airport and bordered by Playa Vista to the north, Inglewood to the east, El Segundo to the south, and Playa del Rey to the west. Until the 2010–11 school year, the school was a comprehensive high school known as Westchester High School.

== History ==
Westchester High School opened to 500 students in September 1948 at what is now Orville Wright Middle School. During the 2010–2011 school year, Westchester High School became Westchester Enriched Sciences Magnets (WESM). There are three programs:

Magnet Programs
Aviation and Aerospace Magnet for Gifted & High Ability Students
Environmental and Natural Science Magnet
Health and Sports Medicine Magnet

On June 1, 2011, at least 400 students walked out to protest the school's displacement of 25 teachers in addition to 10 RIF'd teachers.

In 2011, rapper Tyler, The Creator was arrested in front of the school for promoting his album Goblin.

== About the school ==
The Westchester Enriched Sciences Magnets (WESM) are a trio of science-themed magnet schools, which provide individualized learning opportunities within their small, thematically-aligned programs. Together, the Westchester Magnets form one campus, providing a wide array of athletic and extra-curricular opportunities.

The Westchester Magnets embrace project-based learning. Students synthesize content from all of their classes to create projects and conduct experiments with real-world applications. They engage in hands-on learning as they experience instruction aligned to the themes of the three magnets: Aerospace & Aviation, Environmental & Natural Science, and Health & Sports Medicine.

WESM is able to offer these innovative programs through partnerships with local organizations and businesses like Loyola Marymount University, Boeing, Chevron, and the Team Heal Foundation. Because of the contributions of these partners, WESM offers opportunities for internships, field trips, guest lectures, and demonstrations by scientists and other professionals.

The school expects every student to be involved in at least one extra-curricular activity. Students participate in countless organizations, including clubs, student government, band, drama, cheerleading, drill team, and athletics.

== Curriculum ==
In the WESM Aviation & Aerospace Magnet, students have the opportunity to participate in flight simulation. They also take a shop class where they learn applied physics by working on the engine of a real Cessna airplane, which is located on campus. In the WESM Environmental & Natural Science Magnet, students monitor renewable electricity generated by an on-campus photovoltaic facility. They also take courses focused on urban ecology and green construction. In the WESM Health & Sports Medicine Magnet, students take Athletic Training classes using a state-of-the-art athletic training room. They also study nutrition in a Culinary Arts kitchen.

== Academic performance ==
In recent years, Westchester has shown a consistent trend of dramatically increased academic performance. Over each of the past 5 years, the school has posted significant gains in API (Academic Performance Index), going from a score of 589 in 2007 to a current API of 663.

== Athletics ==
The Westchester Comets have an extensive history of athletic prowess. The school's most prominent program, its boys' basketball team, has won 12 Los Angeles City titles and six Division I California State Championships under its head coach, Ed Azzam. One of its players, Amir Johnson, was drafted directly out of high school there, and was originally considered to be the last high school student to be drafted in the NBA draft until 2015 and 2016 with Satnam Singh Bhamara and Thon Maker, respectively.

The Comets' home football stadium is named in memory of Hank Gathers, who played basketball at Loyola Marymount.

== Student body ==
A majority of the students are African-American, although the school draws students of all ethnic backgrounds from across the Los Angeles area.

Orville Wright Middle School is WESM's primary feeder, although WESM also draws many students from Marina del Rey Middle School, Palms Gifted Magnet, Mark Twain Middle School, and Audubon's Gifted Magnet, along with various charter and private middle schools.

Sharla Berry, a guest columnist for YES! Magazine who attended Westchester from fall 2002 to summer 2006, stated that the school's different ethnic groups interacted with each other frequently.

== Demographics ==
Since its reconfiguration in 2010, Westchester's enrollment has begun to gradually increase. However, this is a reversal of prior enrollment trends. Beginning in the 2004–05 school year, Westchester experienced a dramatic decline in enrollment, reaching a low point in 2010, with a total enrollment of approximately 1300 students.

During the 2004–2005 school year, Westchester had 2726 students.

- 56% were African-American
- 35% were Hispanic
- 6% were White American
- 2% were Asian
- <0% were Filipino
- <0% were Pacific Islanders
- <0% were Indigenous peoples of the Americas

For the 2005-2006 school year, LAUSD opened new schools to relieve overcrowding in the district. LAUSD opened two high schools, Southeast High School in South Gate, California and the Santee Education Complex in Los Angeles. As a result, Westchester's student population dropped to about 1,938 – close to the level of previous years. This was a welcome change for many parents who complained of the overcrowding and disruption caused by busing more students from central Los Angeles to the Westside school.

During the 2005–2006 school year, Westchester had 1938 students.

- 68% were African-American
- 25% were Hispanic
- 4% were White American
- 2% were Asian
- <1% were Filipino
- <1% were Pacific Islanders
- <1% were Native American

The Westchester campus also houses an Aerospace Magnet School that enrolled an additional 362 students in the 2005-2006 school year.

For 2005–2006, Westchester Aerospace Magnet had 361 students.

- 55% were African-American
- 32% were Hispanic
- 9% were White American
- 2% were Asian
- <1% were Filipino
- <1% were Pacific Islanders
- <1% were Native American

Four additional high schools, Arleta, East Valley, Panorama, and Miguel Contreras Learning Complex, opened in fall 2006, again decreasing the number of transfer students in many schools.

== Notable alumni ==
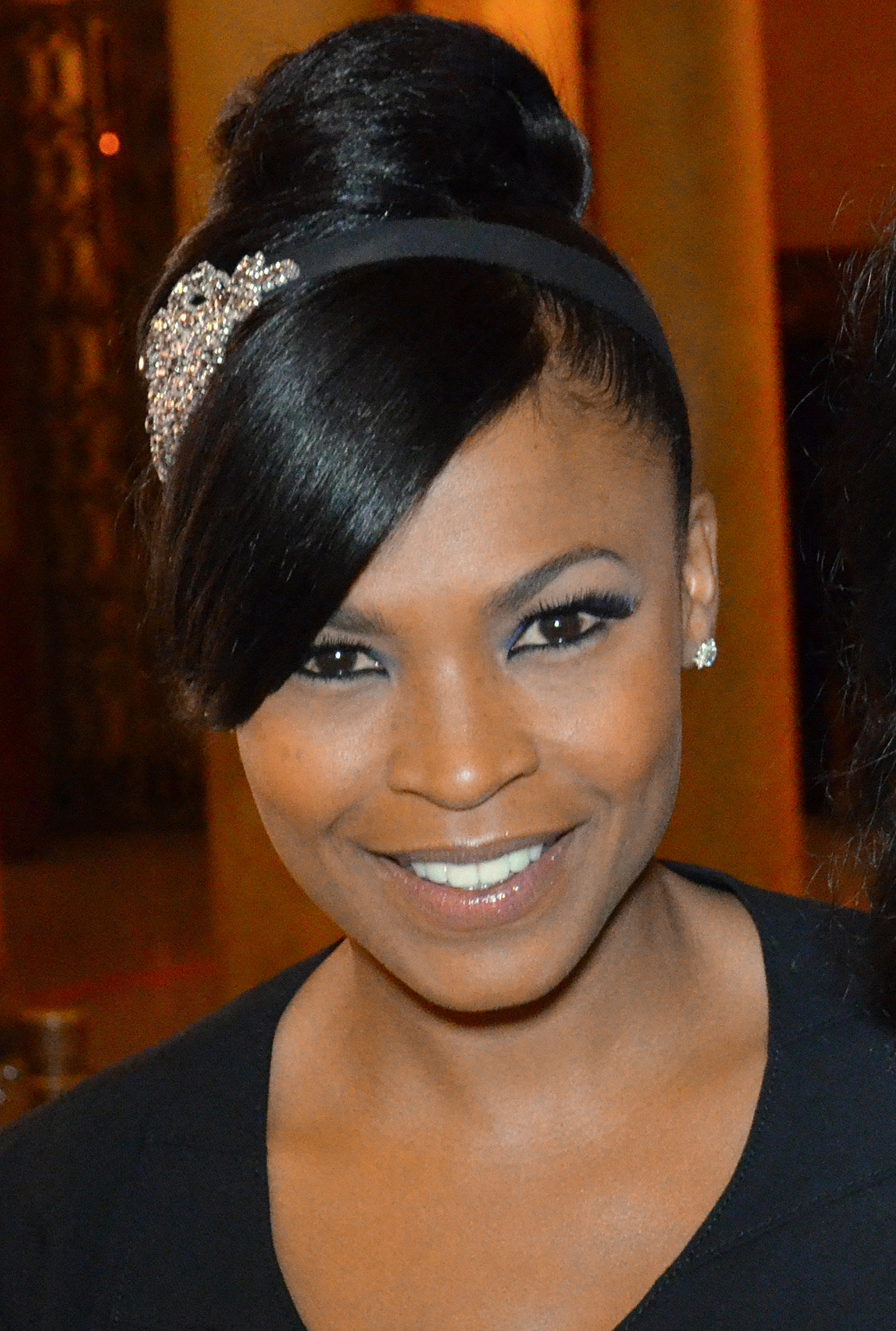
Nia Long

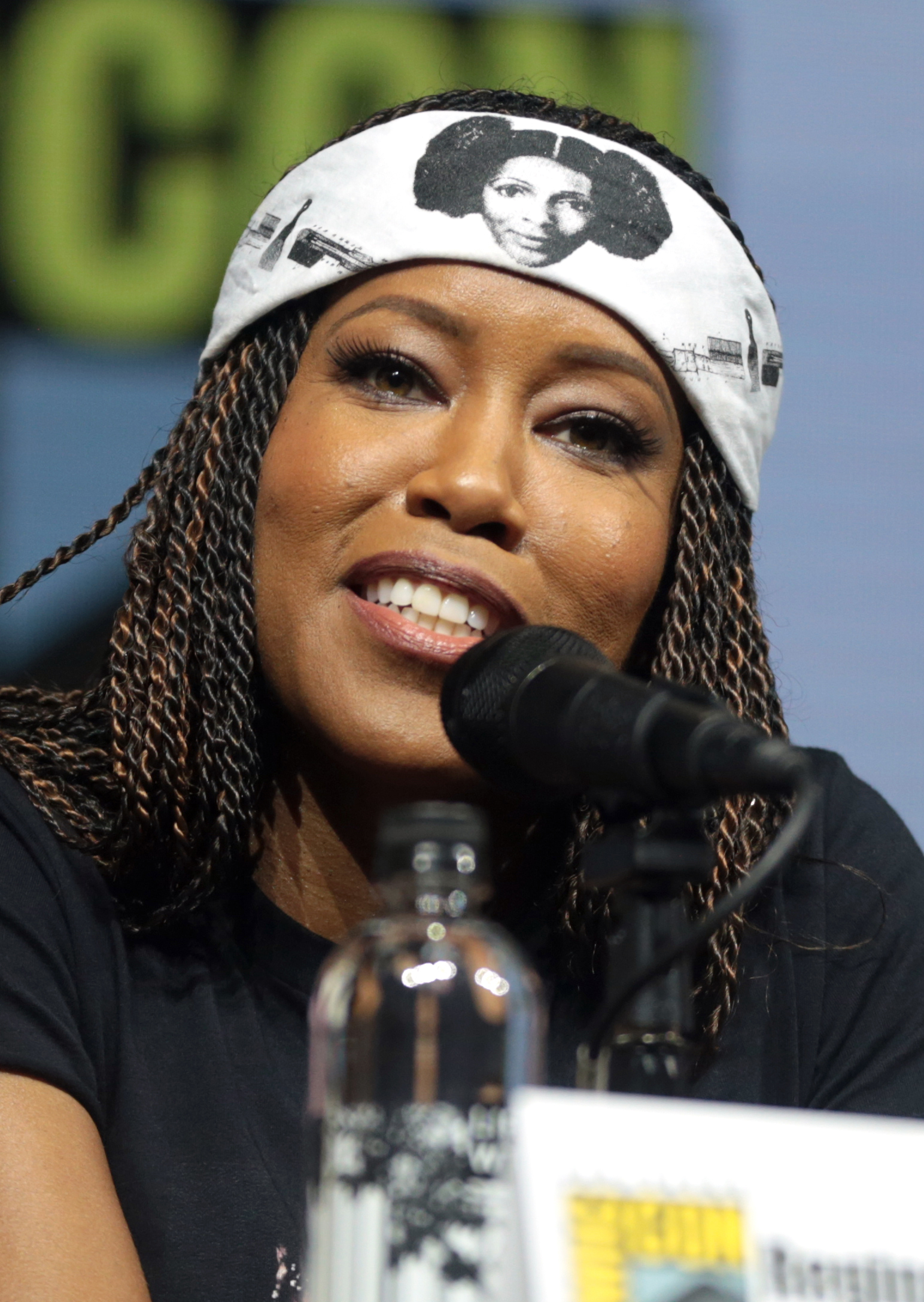
Regina King

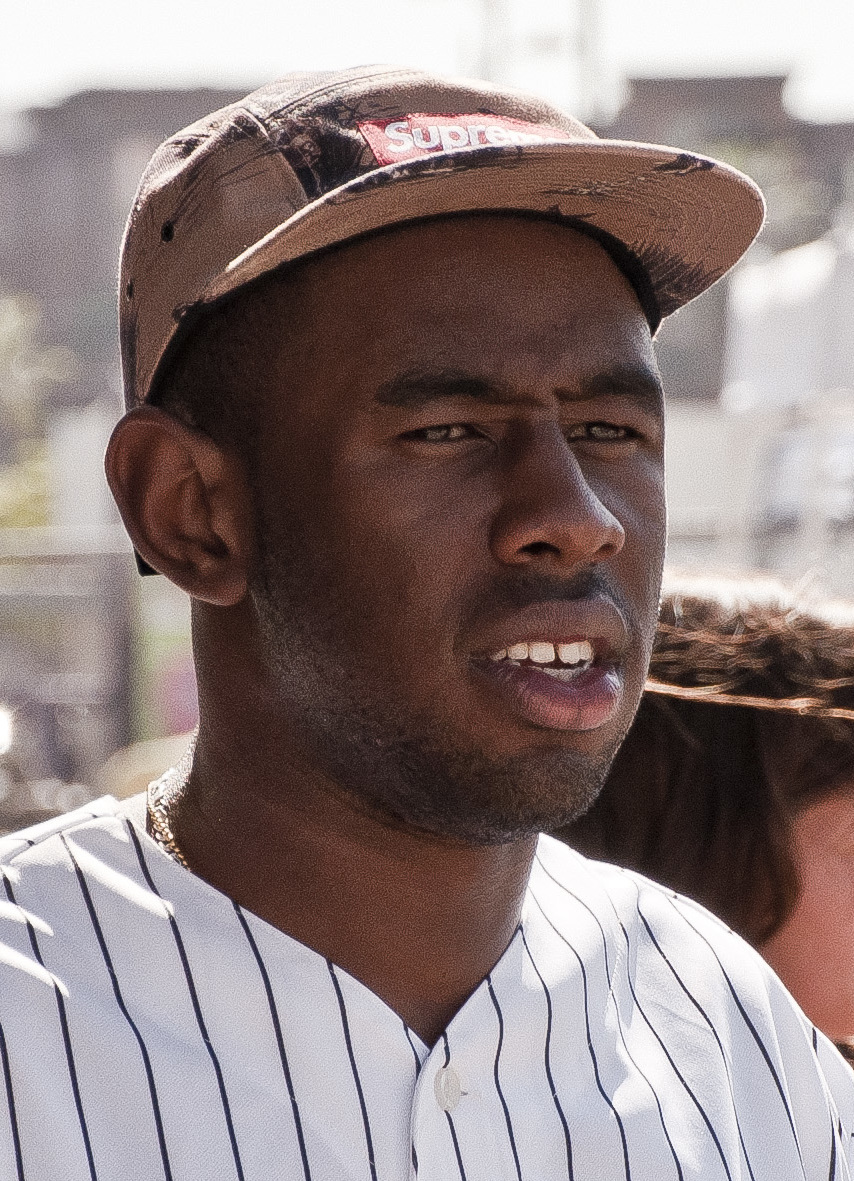
Tyler, The Creator

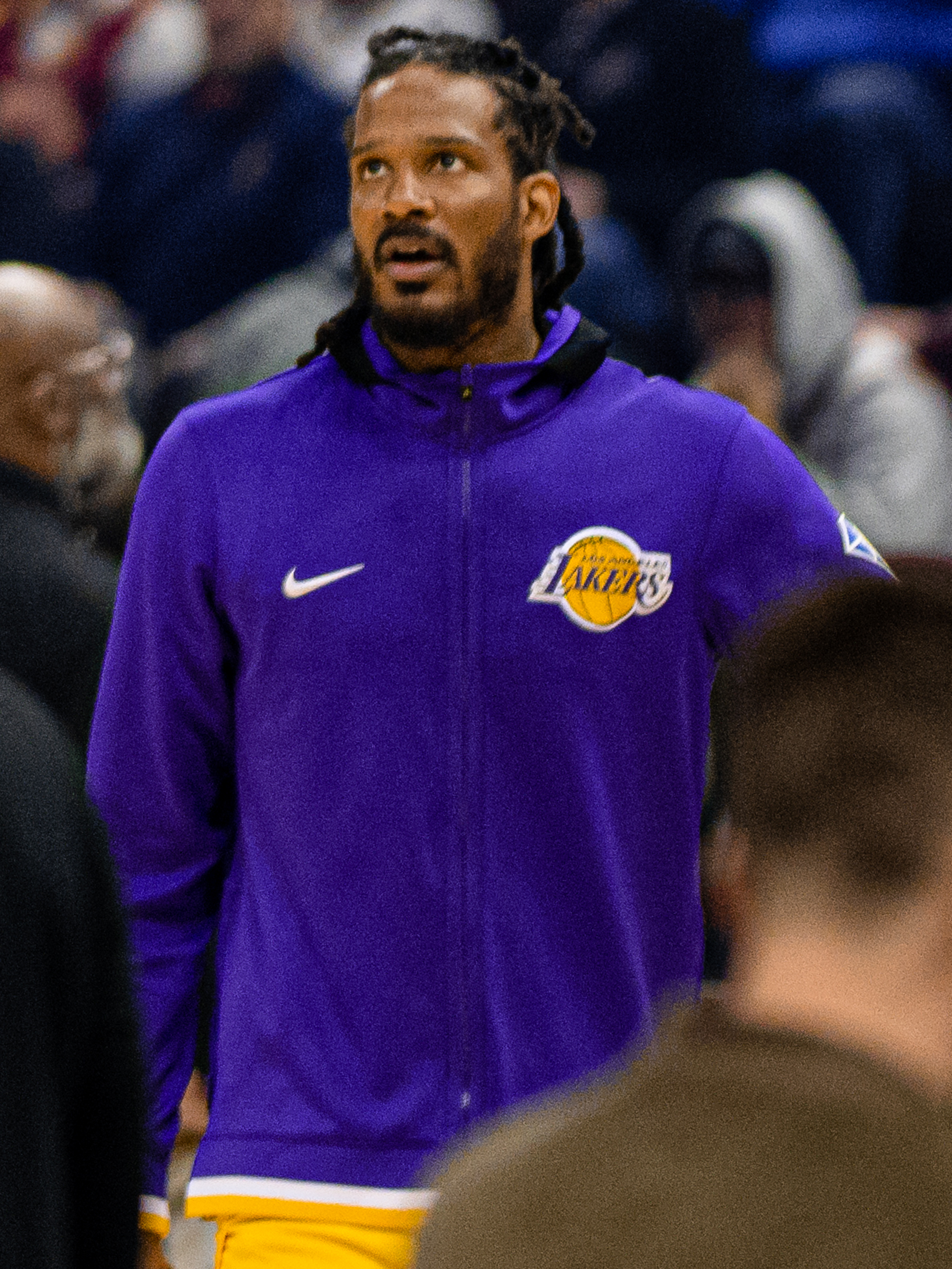
Trevor Ariza

- Michael Zearott (1955), musician and music educator
- Julie Felix (1956), singer
- Al Scates (1957), volleyball player, coach
- Larry Colton (1960), MLB pitcher and writer
- Michael Josephson (1960), attorney & ethicist
- Bruce Lemmerman (1963), NFL quarterback
- Roric Harrison (1964), MLB pitcher
- Howard Kaylan (1965), musician (The Turtles)
- Patricia Krenwinkel (1965), one of the infamous Manson Family killers
- Mark Volman (1965), musician (The Turtles)
- Gene Bruno (1966), acupuncturist
- The Crusaders (1960s), a 1960s garage band who recorded possibly the first gospel rock album
- Phil Hartman (1966), comedian and actor
- Harold Bronson (1967), cofounder of Rhino Entertainment
- Roy Smalley (1970), MLB All-Star shortstop
- Rob Picciolo (1971), MLB shortstop and coach
- John Bachar (1974), rock climbing free-soloist
- Patrick Moten (1975), songwriter
- Anissa Jones (1976), actress
- John J. Garstka (1979), works for the DoD
- Karyn White (1983), singer
- Ken Norton Jr. (1984), NFL player and coach for the Washington Commanders
- Bob Samuelson (1984), volleyball player, Olympic medalist
- Vic Darensbourg (1988), MLB pitcher
- Eric Reed (1988), jazz pianist
- Tim Story (1988), filmmaker
- Sam Crawford (1989), basketball player who played overseas
- Kevin Johnson (1989), NFL defensive tackle
- Regina King (1989), actress
- Nia Long (1989), actress
- Latasha Harlins (died in 1991), shooting victim
- Mikel Jollett (1992), musician (The Airborne Toxic Event) and writer
- Billy Knight (1997), basketball player who played overseas
- Larry Tripplett (1997), NFL defensive tackle
- David Blu (1998), basketball player who played overseas
- Qiana Chase (1999), Playboy playmate
- Brandon Watson (1999), MLB outfielder
- Brian Barton (2000), MLB outfielder
- Thyron Lewis (2000), AFL wide receiver
- Hassan Adams (2002), NBA player
- Brandon Bowman (2002), basketball player who plays overseas
- Trevor Ariza (2003), NBA player
- Bobby Brown (2003), NBA player
- Scott Cutley (2003), college basketball coach, played professionally overseas
- Gabe Pruitt (2004), NBA player
- Amir Johnson (2005), NBA player
- Domo Genesis (2009), rapper
- Tyler, the Creator (2010), rapper
- Lionel Boyce, actor
- Robert Gsellman (2011), MLB pitcher
- Destinee Brown (2012), professional wrestler
- Elijah Stewart (2014), basketball player who plays overseas
- Cameron Young (2014), basketball player who plays overseas
- Roddy Ricch (2016), rapper

== In popular culture ==
Kendrick Lamar mentions this school in his 2024 song "Dodger Blue" in the lyric "What school you went to? Gardena, Compton/ Westchester, King/Drew, then we function...Don't say you hate L.A. when you don't travel past the 10."
