= Greed Is Good (disambiguation) =

"Greed is good" is a catchphrase based on Gordon Gekko's quote "greed, for lack of a better word, is good" from the 1987 film Wall Street.

Greed Is Good may also refer to:

- "Greed Is Good", a 1990 episode of Doogie Howser, M.D.
- "Greed Is Good", a 2016 episode of The Eighties (miniseries)
- "Greed Is Good?", a 2016 episode of Nexo Knights
- Greed Is Good, an offspring of a racehorse Unbridled
