= The Mating Habits of the Earthbound Human =

1999 film by Jeff Abugov

- Directed by: Jeff Abugov
- Written by: Jeff Abugov
- Produced by: Larry Estes
- Starring: Carmen Electra; Mackenzie Astin; Lucy Liu
- Narrated by: David Hyde Pierce
- Music by: Michael McCarty
- Distributed by: Independent Artists
- Release date: September 3, 1999
- Running time: 88 minutes
- Country: United States
- Language: English
- Box office: $4,634 (US)

The Mating Habits of the Earthbound Human is a 1999 American mockumentary directed and written by Jeff Abugov, and starring David Hyde Pierce, Carmen Electra, Lucy Liu, and Mackenzie Astin.

== Premise ==
Hyde Pierce, acting out the role of an alien (credited as "infinity-cubed" in the opening credits), narrates a courtship in a late 20th-century American city, presenting findings and opinions as an extraterrestrial nature documentary. The relationship "footage" is played straight, while the voice-over (with its most often wildly inaccurate theories) and elaborate visual metaphors add comedy. Among other themes the film explores the possibility that, whenever describing their interpretations of other species' acts and feelings, humans may get everything wrong.

== Plot ==
Billy, a shy young man looking for a date, meets the beautiful Jenny Smith at a nightclub. They enter a relationship where Billy is bashful to tell Jenny that he loves her due to fear of being "trapped", and both paramours receive advice from their respective friends. The couple engage in sexual encounters while using barrier devices; during these encounters Billy is unable to reveal to Jenny his affection.

Then, one year after their first meeting, Billy and Jenny decide to take a vacation, and (hastily) sleep together without condoms or diaphragms. Soon after, Jenny discovers that she is pregnant, and argues with Billy, who accuses her of trapping him into marriage. The couple take bad consultations from their coworkers. Eventually, Jenny decides to go to a clinic to abort her unwanted child. Billy comes to his senses and stops her from doing so, resulting in the two confessing their love for one another.

The film ends with Billy and Jenny getting happily married and celebrating the birth of their child.

== Cast ==
- David Hyde Pierce as Narrator (voice)
- Mackenzie Astin as The Male (Billy Waterson)
- Carmen Electra as The Female (Jenny Smith)
- Markus Redmond as The Male's Friend
- Lucy Liu as The Female's Friend (Lydia)
- Lisa Rotondi as The Female's Slutty Friend (Ian Calder)
- Sharon Wyatt as The Male's Mother
- Jack Kehler as The Male's Father
- Leo Rossi as The Female's Father
- Antonette Saftler as The Female's Mother
- Marc Blucas as The Female's Ex-Boyfriend
- Anne Gee Byrd as The Female's Boss
- Eric Kushnick as The Female's Brother
- Linda Porter as The Wise Old Woman
- Tyler Abugov as The Female's Fantasy Son

== Reception ==
On the review aggregator website Rotten Tomatoes, 36% of 11 critics' reviews are positive, with an average rating of 4.7/10. Metacritic, which uses a weighted average, assigned the film a score of 26 out of 100, based on 8 critics, indicating "generally unfavorable" reviews.
