= Scott Goldstein =

American film producer

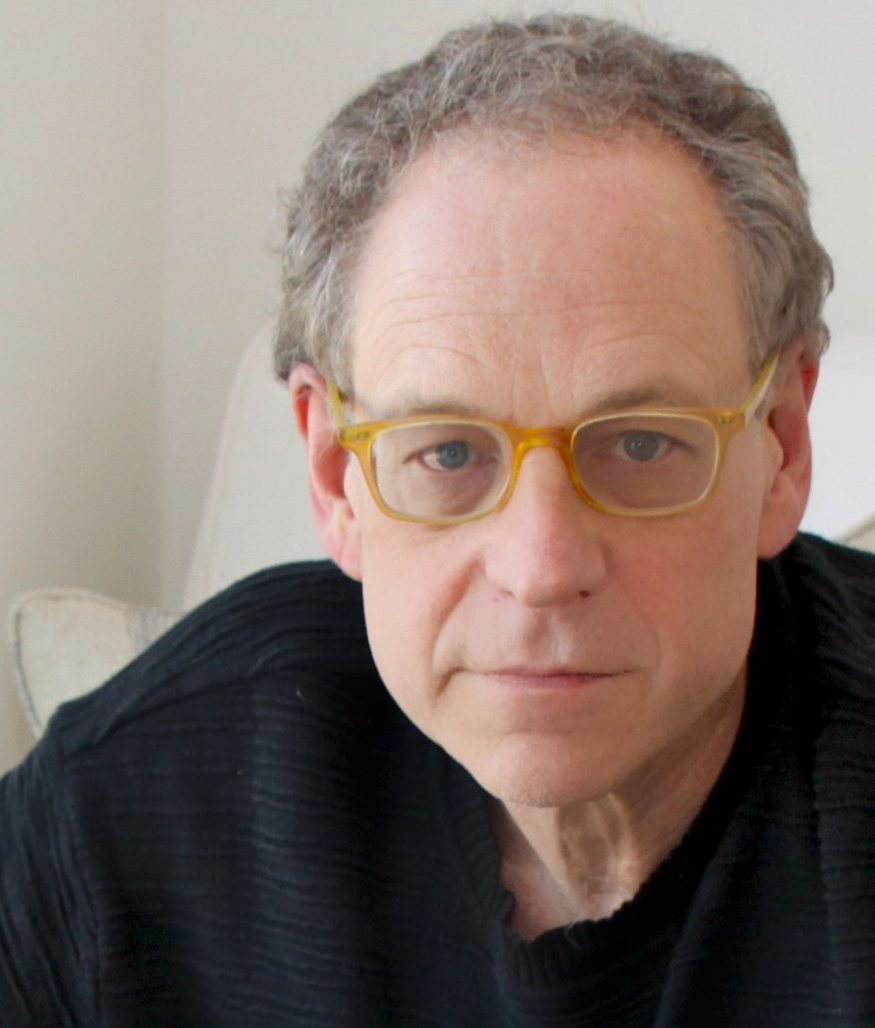
- Goldstein in 2015
- Born: New York City, New York U.S.
- Status: Separated
- Education: Lake Forest College
- Occupations: Writer, producer, director
- Years active: 1966–present
- Notable credit(s): "Where I Stand: The Hank Greenspun Story" "Gay Bullying Interactive" "Museum of Tolerance Exhibits" "Endgame: Ethics and Values in America (PBS)" "Doogie Howser M.D. "LA Law" "Today Show" "The Last Deadline: Death of the Chicago Daily News"
- Spouse: Susan Tick (1978–2019)
- Children: Lauren Cory; Molly Jordan Deceased 2020

Scott Goldstein is a writer, producer, and director based in Los Angeles. He has achieved success in broadcast journalism, prime time entertainment, interactive educational & museum exhibits and documentaries. He is the winner of two Emmy and Golden Globe Awards.

== Early life ==
Scott Goldstein was born in the Washington Heights (now Hudson Heights) neighborhood of Manhattan. He attended PS 187, Columbia Grammar & Preparatory School, and Lake Forest College. His father, Meyer Goldstein, manufactured women's sportswear in New York's garment district. In the early 1950s, facing unauthorized work stoppages by the Teamsters Union, he was approached by and became a reluctant partner with Philadelphia mobster Harry Rosen (a.k.a. “Nig” Rosen) a lieutenant of underworld boss Meyer Lansky. His wife, Lenore Goldstein, was a longtime bookkeeper. Their eldest son, Laurence, was a book critic for The New York Times, a reporter for UPI, a producer for ABC News and NBC News, and co-author of Into Film with Jay Kauffman. He was killed at the age of 36 in a freak electrical accident while adjusting a television set at home in Leonia, New Jersey, on Feb 12, 1972.

== Career ==
=== Career in news ===
While a senior at Columbia Grammar, Mr. Goldstein worked after school as a production assistant and writer of the 1am sign-off news at WABC-TV. This led to summer employment as a field producer for ABC news anchor Peter Jennings at the violent demonstrations in Grant Park at the 1968 Democratic National Convention and later as an assistant producer for the ABC News global pool coverage of the first Moon landing. After graduating Lake Forest College as a philosophy major, he worked for the international news film agency Visnews (later Reuters Television) in London where he wrote and edited news stories syndicated to over one hundred countries.

After returning to the U.S., he was hired by KING-TV in Seattle as a writer, producer of the noon news, reporter and film critic. In 1973 he was hired by KNBC-TV in Los Angeles as a writer for Tom Brokaw, Tom Snyder and Jess Marlow. Between 1974 and 1976, he produced and wrote the weekend news, election coverage and special projects for KGO-TV San Francisco and served as the station's key producer on the Patty Hearst kidnaping. He wrote and produced the special "Patty Hearst : A Case of Coercive Persuasion" that aired immediately after her trial ended.

In 1976 he was named Special Projects producer for WMAQ-TV Chicago. His “Last Deadline: The Death of the Chicago Daily News” was nominated for a Chicago Emmy award in 1977 as best news special.

In 1978 he returned to Los Angeles as West Coast Producer for the Today Show where he produced and wrote pieces for Jack Perkins, Boyd Matson, Tom Brokaw and Jane Pauley. In 1981 he was named Producer, then Supervising Producer, of the Today Show in New York. He also field produced many of Today's specials including the Royal Wedding of Princess Diana, Today in Prime Time and Today Goes to College at the University of Michigan and Brown University.

=== Primetime television ===
In 1986 he made the switch from broadcast news to prime time drama. For three years he served as producer of the critically acclaimed hit show “LA Law”; winning two Emmy and Golden Globe awards. He then joined Steven Bochco Productions in launching Doogie Howser, M.D. He was the program's supervising producer for the entire length of the series and directed numerous episodes with star Neil Patrick Harris.

After the show ended its run in 1993, Mr. Goldstein formed Scott Goldstein Productions (later SgpMedia). Its first project was a co-venture with the Museum of Television and Radio (now the Paley Center): Science Fiction: A Journey into the Unknown. The two-hour Fox network special, hosted by Dean Cain, Carrie Fisher, Leonard Nimoy, and William Shatner, was the definitive history of science fiction on television and focused on how the genre sheds light on the real world.

In 2002, he created one of the first live PBS Interactive Specials, Endgame: Ethics and Values In America, hosted by Carol Marin with Michael Josephson. It enabled viewers to enter the lives of fictional characters forced to make critical decisions with profound moral, ethical or social implications. The program was a combination of a dramatic film, a live studio audience and panel, interactivity on the Web, and sync-to-broadcast technology. It drew its inspiration from “The Point of View Diner”; an interactive exhibit he previously created for the Museum of Tolerance in Los Angeles

=== Multi-media and interactive museum exhibits ===
Mr. Goldstein created most of the core multi-media exhibits for the Simon Wiesenthal Center’s Los Angeles Museum of Tolerance and New York Tolerance Center. These highly interactive exhibits empower the museum visitors to weigh in on important ethical and political issues. More than 350,000 people, many of them students, visit the museum every year. The exhibits take many shapes and forms:

“The Point of View Diner": an interactive experience set in a 1950s style diner with computer input terminals designed as juke boxes. The interactive films deal with situational ethics involving issues ranging from teen age drunk driving to free vs hate speech to gay bullying in high schools.

"The Millennium Machine": a multi-media exhibit set in a futuristic “time machine”. The videos examine the global abuse of women and children, the plight of political refugees, and the proliferation of weapons of mass destruction.

“In Our Times”: a multi screen look at global genocide throughout the ages with emphasis on human rights abuses in contemporary society,

=== Documentaries ===
Mr. Goldstein produced, wrote and directed the documentary Holocaust for the New York Tolerance Center. The film, narrated by Joe Mantegna, examines the reasons behind the mass slaughter of Jewish citizens and questions how Germany, arguably the world's most technologically sophisticated nation, could be reduced to barbarism.

In 2008, he produced, wrote, and directed the documentary Where I Stand: The Hank Greenspun Story. The film, narrated in the first person by Anthony Hopkins, tells the previously untold story of Hank Greenspun, who was one of the last the fire breathing, give-’em-hell crusading newspaper publishers. His exploits included being P.R. man for Bugsy Siegel at the Flamingo Hotel; a convicted heavy arms runner to the Yishuv during 1948 Arab–Israeli War; and an indictment to incite, through his news column, the murder of Senator Joseph McCarthy. Using previously classified government records, the film reveals how Greenspun brought Howard Hughes into Las Vegas to buy out the mob and his secret relationship with the billionaire that led to a break-in at his Las Vegas Sun office by the Watergate burglar s. The film has won best documentary at numerous film festivals.

== Personal life ==
Mr. Goldstein is permanently separated from Susan Tick. The two met in Chicago covering the presidential election of Jimmy Carter in 1976 and were married two years later. Ms. Tick was formerly a news anchor/reporter for WMAQ and WFYR radio in Chicago. A television reporter for CNN, KNXT-TV, WPIX-TV and a studio executive at CBS Television and Sony Pictures Entertainment (Columbia, TriStar). They have two children, Cory and Molly. Cory holds a MFT degree and practices in Los Angeles. Molly died at the age of 29 in 2020

== Awards ==
- Chicago Emmy nominee (1977) “The Last Deadline: Death of the Chicago Daily News”
- Emmy Award (1987) Producer, Best Drama “LA Law”
- Emmy Award (1989) Producer, Best Drama “ LA Law”
- Golden Globe Award (1986 )
- Golden Globe Award (1987)
- Best Documentary/Audience Choice Awards at numerous Jewish Film Festivals (2009–2011) including Seattle, San Diego, Los Angeles, Philadelphia, Denver and Minneapolis
