= John J. Garstka =

Member of the Office of the Secretary of Defense

John Joseph Garstka (born February 20, 1961) is the acting CISO for acquisition and sustainment at the Department of Defense

== Biography ==
Prior to joining the Office of Force Transformation, Garstka was the Chief Technology Officer in the Joint Staff Directorate for Command, Control, Computer and Communications (C4) Systems. He played a key role in the development and conceptualization of network-centric warfare and was the Joint Staff lead for the Department of Defense's Report to Congress on Network Centric Warfare.

Prior to joining the Joint Staff, Garstka was a Senior Systems Engineer with Cambridge Research Associates,

Before joining Cambridge, Garstka served as an officer in the United States Air Force (USAF) for ten years, with assignments on the Air Staff and at USAF Space and Missile Center.

== Early life and education ==
Garstka was born in Tokyo and raised in Los Angeles. He graduated from Westchester High School in 1979. Garstka is a Distinguished Graduate of the United States Air Force Academy, where he earned a Bachelor of Science degree in Mathematics in 1983. He also holds a Master of Science Degree in Engineering-Economic Systems from Stanford University, where he studied as a Hertz Fellow.

== Publications ==
Publications and reports he has authored or co-authored include:

- Network Centric Warfare: Developing and Leveraging Information Superiority, by Alberts, Garstka, and Stein, CCRP Press, 1999. This book has been reprinted by leading IT companies and translated into three languages. Online at the DoD Command and Control Research Program
- Understanding Information Age Warfare, by Alberts, Garstka, Hayes, and Signori, CCRP Press, 2001. Online at the DoD Command and Control Research Program
- Network Centric Warfare: Its Origin and Future, which appeared in Proceedings of the Naval Institute in January 1998.
- Network Centric Warfare: An Overview of Emerging Theory, which appeared in PHALANX in December 2000.
- DoD Report to Congress on Network Centric Warfare, July 2001. Online at the DoD Command and Control Research Program
