= K-11 (film) =

- Movie poster
- Directed by: Jules Stewart
- Written by: Jules Stewart; Jared Kurt
- Produced by: Tom Wright, Jr.
- Starring: Goran Višnjić; Kate del Castillo; D. B. Sweeney; Portia Doubleday; Jason Mewes; Tommy "Tiny" Lister
- Cinematography: Adam Silver
- Edited by: Duwayne Dunham
- Music by: Phillip Marshall
- Production company: Libertine Films
- Distributed by: Breaking Glass Pictures
- Release dates: November 16, 2012 (Turin); March 15, 2013
- Running time: 88 minutes
- Country: United States
- Language: English

K-11 is a 2012 American prison drama film co-written (with Jared Kurt) and directed by Jules Stewart. The film stars an ensemble cast of generally independent film actors including Goran Višnjić, Kate del Castillo, D. B. Sweeney, Portia Doubleday, Jason Mewes, and Tommy "Tiny" Lister.

The term "K-11" refers to a dormitory section of the Los Angeles jail used to hold gay and transgender inmates. The film tells the story of Raymond Saxx Jr., a powerful record producer who wakes from a drug-induced blackout to find himself locked up and classified in the segregated "K-11" unit for LGBTQ inmates. The ward has a de facto leader who controls the black market drug trade in the unit, which is also run by a corrupt, abusive guard. Ray's struggle to contact the outside world and regain his freedom seems impossible, but he must learn to navigate the new power structure in K-11 if he is ever going to survive and get control of his life again.

== Plot ==
The movie starts with Saxx in an LA prison, so high on drugs that he cannot be questioned. However, prison guard Johnson seems to take a special interest in him, bribes a colleague, and puts him in a holding cell for cellblock K-11, a unit for LGBT inmates. With him is a young transgender woman who calls herself "Butterfly". After one night, Saxx is put in block K-11, though Butterfly is to remain in the holding cell overnight. Among others, he meets the self-proclaimed boss Mousey and the burly child molester Detroit. At first, the inmates frighten and disgust him, but he gradually begins to enjoy their company. There is a great trade-in cocaine in the cellblock, which is being smuggled in by the guard who put Saxx in K-11, Lt. Johnson. When drug kingpin Ben refuses to give Johnson a bigger cut of the drugs, he is put in the general population. Lt. Johnson attempts to rape Saxx during a riot caused by Mousey. After being raped by Detroit twice, Butterfly brutally murders him with a pair of razor blades and the other inmates help her to hide the weapons and they claim not to have witnessed the incident.

Saxx is told that he is being charged with the murder of his associate, songwriter Ian Sheffield, who happened to be having an affair with Saxx's wife. Saxx's lawyer informs him that his wife, the only witness of Ian's death, wants to divorce him, leaving him with only $30,000 and his car. If Saxx does not agree, his wife will testify that the death was a murder; if he does sign, she will tell police the death was an accident. Saxx signs the documents, knowing he will be released soon. He makes a deal with Mousey to get back at the corrupt Lt. Johnson before he leaves: Mousey has sex with Johnson and then files rape charges against him. After prison officers discover Johnson having sex with Mousey, he is charged with rape and the murder of Detroit before being taken into custody and put in a cell next to Ben, who implies Johnson will be punished by other inmates. To complete the deal, Saxx deposits $13,000 in Mousey's account before being released. When he is a free man, his only assets are $17,000 and his car. When he gets into his luxury car, his first step is to get rid of the drug stash hidden in the vehicle.

== Cast ==
- Goran Višnjić as Raymond Saxx Jr.
- Kate del Castillo as "Mousey"
- D. B. Sweeney as Gerard Johnson
- Portia Doubleday as "Butterfly"
- Jason Mewes as Ben Shapiro
- Tommy "Tiny" Lister as "Detroit"
- Sonya Eddy as Teresa Luna
- Luis Moncada as "ShyBoy"
- Craig Owens as Ian Sheffield
- Tiffany Mulheron as Tia Saxx
- P. J. Byrne as C.R.
- Paul Zies as Washington
- Tara Buck as Crystal
- Jonathan Roumie as Rookie Stewart
- Lou Beatty Jr. as Granny
- Billy Morrison as "Hollywood"
- Alexandra Grey as Xandra Kayden
- Ralph Cole Jr. as "Kay-Kay"
- Markus Redmond as "Precious"
- Cameron B. Stewart as "Sledgehammer"
- Franc Ross as Wino
- Tim de Zarn as Les ″Cowboy″ Williams
- Michael Shamus Wiles as Captain Davis
- John Prosky as Simon Schwartz
- Ian Nelson as Rookie Harris
- Kristen Stewart as Ray's Secretary (voice)

== Production ==
K-11 was announced in November 2008 with Jules Stewart to write and direct and Kristen Stewart, Jules' daughter, and her Twilight co-star Nikki Reed in roles, but both later dropped out due to scheduling conflicts with the Twilight films. When Kristen and Nikki dropped out in July 2011, her brother, Cameron, was given a role.
