= Eva Loseth =

American actress (born 1968)

Eva Loseth (born December 20, 1968, in Chicago, Illinois, US) is an American former actress who had guest starring appearances in a total of nine episodes over seven television series from 1991 to 1995.

She guest starred in Saved by the Bell, Quantum Leap, Doogie Howser, M.D., Silk Stalkings, Weird Science, Diagnosis: Murder and in the Star Trek: Deep Space Nine episode "Life Support".

Loseth's last two credited roles were in the feature films Art House (1998) and The Dead Girl (2006).

As of 2023, and since at least 2012, Loseth is a real estate agent in Chicago.
