= Gene Bruno =

American acupuncturist

Gene Bruno, OMD, LAc, FNAAOM (born April 13, 1948, in Los Angeles) is an American acupuncturist and doctor of Oriental Medicine. In 1974 Bruno helped establish the first school of acupuncture (New England School of Acupuncture) in the United States, and the second school (California Acupuncture College) in 1975.

== Biography ==
Bruno attended U.C.L.A. and became a staff acupuncturist for the National Acupuncture Association (NAA) located in Westwood, California. As an NAA acupuncturist he participated in the Acupuncture Pain Clinic at UCLA medical school in 1972.

In 1972, Bruno accepted an appointment as one of the Directors of the NAA’s Veterinary Acupuncture Research Project. He and his associate, Dr. John Ottaviano, introduced animal acupuncture into the United States for the first time.

The result of this work of the NAA’s veterinary research team led to the training of veterinarians in acupuncture by Drs. Bruno and Ottaviano. This in turn led to the establishment of the National Association of Veterinary Acupuncture (NAVA) and later, the International Veterinary Acupuncture Association (IVAS), in 1974.

Dr. Bruno was the co-founder of the Massachusetts Acupuncture Association in 1974, and the co-founder of the Oregon Acupuncture Association in 1978 with Dr. Wei Tak Cheung. He founded the Trudy McAlister Fund in 2007, a charitable scholarship foundation. He and Dr. Joel Rossen founded the American Board of Animal Acupuncture in 2013.

== Research focus ==
In addition to the extensive research on developing veterinary acupuncture, Bruno has participated in research projects at Harvard Medical School and at the University of Massachusetts, Amherst, looking into the practical applications of acupuncture in the treatment of pain. Dr. Bruno also developed a treatment protocol for using micro-current stimulation to treat macular degeneration.

== Other ==
Bruno has served on numerous boards including the Acupuncture Committees of the Board of Medicine of Oregon and Board of Medicine of Washington. He was served as president of the [www.aaom.org American Association of Oriental Medicine (AAAOM)].

In 2007, Dr. Bruno was elected to the Executive Board of the World Federation of Chinese Medicine Societies (WFCMS). He currently serves as the President of the Trudy McAlister Foundation, which awards scholarships to students of acupuncture and Oriental medicine.

== Awards ==
- Pioneers and Leaders Award October - 2007 - Presented by American Association of Acupuncture & Oriental Medicine
- Founders of the Profession Lifetime Achievement Award - October 2006 - Presented by American Association of Oriental Medicine
- Special Award for Advancing Oriental Medicine in the State of Oregon - October 1993 - Presented by the Oregon Acupuncture Association
- Special Merit Award for the Founding of Veterinary Acupuncture in the US - July 1975 - Presented by the National Acupuncture Association

== See also ==
- James Tin Yau So
