= Family Rules (American TV series) =

- Genre: Sitcom
- Created by: Russell Marcus
- Starring: Greg Evigan; Maggie Lawson; Shawna Waldron; Andi Eystad; Brooke Garrett; Markus Redmond
- Composer: Craig Stuart Garfinkle
- Country of origin: United States
- Original language: English
- No. of seasons: 1
- No. of episodes: 6

Production
- Executive producers: Russell Marcus; Brian Henson; Margaret Loesch
- Running time: 30 minutes
- Production company: Jim Henson Productions

Original release
- Network: UPN
- Release: March 9 – April 13, 1999

Family Rules is an American television sitcom that aired on UPN from March 9 to April 13, 1999.

== Synopsis ==
The series centered on Nate Harrison, a widowed basketball coach at Morgan College in Baltimore, Maryland, who was raising his four daughters – 16-year-old Hope, 15-year-old Ann, 14-year-old C.J., and 11-year-old Lucy.

== Cast ==
- Greg Evigan as Nate Harrison
- Maggie Lawson as Hope Harrison
- Shawna Waldron as Ann Harrison
- Andi Eystad as C.J. Harrison
- Brooke Garrett as Lucy Harrison
- Markus Redmond as Phil Bennett

== Episodes ==
No.	Title	Directed by	Written by	Original release date	Prod. code
1	"Ann's Big Night"	Iris Dugow	Lyn Greene & Richard Levine	March 9, 1999	102
2	"The Gap"	Kim Friedman	Jeffrey C. Sherman	March 16, 1999	106
3	"The Pilot"	John Tracy	Russell Marcus	March 23, 1999	101
4	"Party Girl"	Kim Friedman	Lyn Greene & Richard Levine	March 30, 1999	105
5	"Change Partners"	Unknown	Unknown	April 6, 1999	103
6	"Bunny Von Bulow"	Unknown	Unknown	April 13, 1999	104
