= If I Had Known I Was a Genius =

- Theatrical poster
- Directed by: Dominique Wirtschafter
- Written by: Markus Redmond
- Produced by: Mike Crawford; Al Hayes; Daniel Sadek; Elie Samaha; Andrea Sperling; Dominique Wirtschafter
- Starring: Markus Redmond; Whoopi Goldberg; Keith David; Debra Wilson; Sharon Stone; Tara Reid; Della Reese
- Cinematography: Scott Kevan
- Edited by: Jeff Canavan
- Music by: John Coda
- Release date: January 23, 2007 (Sundance Film Festival)
- Running time: 102 minutes
- Country: United States
- Language: English

If I Had Known I Was a Genius is a film directed by Dominique Wirtschafter and written by Markus Redmond (who also stars in the film). The film premiered January 23, 2007 at the Sundance Film Festival.

== Plot ==
Michael (Markus Redmond) is an African-American boy with a genius I.Q. His family refuses to encourage him and tries to bring him down, and his mother (Whoopi Goldberg) nicknames him "Ugly". Michael enrolls in a high school drama class and finds encouragement from an eccentric teacher.

== Cast ==
- Markus Redmond as Michael Reed
- Whoopi Goldberg as Mrs. Reed
- Keith David as Mr. Reed
- Debra Wilson as Teresa Reed
- Sharon Stone as Gloria Fremont
- Tara Reid as Stephanie
- Della Reese as Nana
- Andy Richter as Game Show Host
- French Stewart as Public School Principal
- David Denman as Baker
- Nadia Bjorlin as Faith
- Julie Hagerty as Teacher
