= Doogie Howser, M.D. =

American medical sitcom (1989–1993)

- Genre: Medical sitcom
- Created by: Steven Bochco; David E. Kelley
- Starring: Neil Patrick Harris; Max Casella; Belinda Montgomery; Lawrence Pressman; Mitchell Anderson; Kathryn Layng; Lisa Dean Ryan; Lucy Boryer; Markus Redmond; James B. Sikking
- Theme music composer: Mike Post
- Composer: Mike Post
- Country of origin: United States
- Original language: English
- No. of seasons: 4
- No. of episodes: 97 (list of episodes)

Production
- Executive producers: Steven Bochco; Linda Morris (seasons 3–4); Vic Rauseo (seasons 3–4); Neil Patrick Harris (seasons 3-4)
- Producers: Nat Bernstein; Joe Ann Fogle; Scott Goldstein; Jill Gordon; Nick Harding; Mark Horowitz; Mitchel Lee Katlin; Phil Kellard; Neil Patrick Harris (season 1-2); Tom Moore; Linda Morris; Vic Rauseo
- Camera setup: Single-camera
- Running time: 21–23 minutes
- Production companies: Steven Bochco Productions; 20th Century Fox Television

Original release
- Network: ABC
- Release: September 19, 1989 – March 24, 1993

Related
- Doogie Kameāloha, M.D.

Doogie Howser, M.D. is an American medical sitcom that ran for four seasons on ABC from September 19, 1989, to March 24, 1993, totaling 97 episodes. Created by Steven Bochco and David E. Kelley, the show stars Neil Patrick Harris in the title role as a teenage physician who balances the challenge of practicing medicine with the everyday problems of teenage life.

== Plot ==
Dr. Douglas "Doogie" Howser (Harris) is the son of David (James B. Sikking) and Katherine Howser (Belinda Montgomery). As a child, he twice survived early-stage pediatric leukemia after his father—a family physician—discovered suspicious bruising. The experience contributed to the younger Howser's desire to enter medicine.

Possessing a genius intellect and a photographic memory, Doogie participates in a longitudinal study of child prodigies until his 18th birthday. He earned a perfect score on the SAT at the age of six, completed high school in nine weeks, graduated from Princeton University in 1983 at age 10, and finished medical school four years later. At age 14, Howser was the youngest licensed physician in the country. As a newspaper article (one of several noting some of Doogie's aforementioned accomplishments that are shown in the series' opening title sequence) stated, he "can't buy beer... [but] can prescribe drugs".

The series begins on Doogie's 16th birthday; the cold open of the pilot episode shows him stopping his field test for his driver's license to help an injured person at the scene of a traffic accident. Doogie is a second-year resident surgeon at Eastman Medical Center in Los Angeles, and still lives at home with his parents. Doogie's best friend and neighbor, Vinnie Delpino (Max Casella), is a more typical teenager who often climbs through Doogie's bedroom window to visit and connects him to life outside of medicine. Doogie has kept a diary on his computer since 1979; episodes typically end with him making an entry in it, writing observations about the situations or lessons he had experienced or learned in the episode.

Doogie seeks acceptance both from children his age and from his professional colleagues. Many episodes also deal with wider social problems: AIDS awareness, racism, antisemitism, homophobia, sexism, gang violence, access to quality medical care, and losing one's virginity are topics, along with aging, body issues, and friendship.

Doogie initially has a girlfriend, Wanda Plenn (Lisa Dean Ryan), but they break up after she leaves for college; he also begins a trauma surgery fellowship and moves into his own apartment. Bochco intended to end the show with a "season-long story arc for Doogie where he becomes disaffected with the practice of medicine and quits medicine to become a writer". ABC abruptly canceled the show due to low ratings, preventing Bochco and the show's writers from implementing that storyline, other than Howser's resignation from Eastman and departure for Europe in the final episode.

== Production ==
The weekly, half-hour dramedy was created by Steven Bochco. He originated the concept and asked David E. Kelley to help write the pilot, earning Kelley a "created by" credit. Harris was the first actor the show's staff had found that could convincingly play a teenage doctor, but ABC executives opposed his casting. Bochco's contract required that the network pay an "enormous" penalty if it canceled the project, so ABC was forced to let him film the pilot. The network still opposed Harris's casting and disliked the pilot, but after positive reception during test screenings, ABC greenlit the show.

== Cast ==
From left to right, Lawrence Pressman as Dr. Canfield, Neil Patrick Harris as Doogie Howser, Mitchell Anderson as Dr. McGuire and Kathryn Layng as Nurse Spaulding

=== Main cast ===
- Neil Patrick Harris as Dr. Douglas "Doogie" Howser, the show's protagonist.
- Max Casella as Vincent "Vinnie" Salvatore Delpino, Doogie's best friend since they were five years old. A typical girl-crazy teenager, Vinnie resists his father's demands to join the family business and instead attends film school to pursue a career as a film director.
- Belinda Montgomery as Katherine Howser, Doogie Howser's mother. Originally a housewife, she later returns to work as a patient advocate at her son's hospital.
- Lawrence Pressman as Dr. Benjamin Canfield, head of Eastman Medical. Canfield is an old friend and classmate of David Howser, and persuades him to join the hospital to run its family practice.
- Mitchell Anderson (seasons 1–2) as Dr. Jack McGuire, a resident at Eastman and Doogie's friendly rival. A visit to rural Mexico inspires him to leave the hospital to serve the poor overseas.
- Kathryn Layng as Mary Margaret "Curly" Spaulding, a nurse at Eastman. Spaulding occasionally dates McGuire and, briefly, both Canfield and Howser.
- James B. Sikking as Dr. David Howser, Doogie Howser's father. He's a Vietnam War MASH veteran with a family practice.
- Lisa Dean Ryan (seasons 1–2, recurring in season 3) as Wanda Plenn, Vinnie's high-school classmate and Doogie's girlfriend. After her mother dies in an automobile accident, Wanda's relationship with Doogie suffers. After she leaves for the School of the Art Institute of Chicago they end their relationship.
- Lucy Boryer (seasons 1–3, two episodes in season 4) as Janine Stewart, Vinnie's girlfriend and Wanda's best friend. She drops out of college and becomes a buyer for a department store.
- Markus Redmond (seasons 2–4, guest star in season 1) as Raymond Alexander, an orderly (and later an EMT) at Eastman. While he was a gang member, Alexander meets Doogie after taking him hostage during a convenience-store robbery; after finishing his sentence, Doogie helps him get a job at the hospital as an orderly.

=== Recurring cast ===
- Rif Hutton as Dr. Ron Welch, a fellow doctor who is also friends with Howser.
- Robyn Lively as Michele Faber (seasons 2 and 4), a nursing student. She becomes Howser's girlfriend shortly before he decides to leave Eastman and go to Europe.
- Barry Livingston as Dr. Bob Rickett (seasons 2–4), a fellow doctor working at Eastman.

== Episodes ==
Season	Episodes	Originally released		Rank	Rating
Season	Episodes	First released	Last released	Rank	Rating
1	26	September 19, 1989	May 2, 1990	28	14.5 (Note: Tied with The Simpsons and Night Court)
2	25	September 12, 1990	May 1, 1991	24	14.7
3	24	September 25, 1991	May 13, 1992	34	12.9
4	22	September 23, 1992	March 24, 1993	57	10.2

== Syndication ==
In the United States, reruns of Doogie Howser, M.D. ran in syndication between September 1994 and September 1996. Repeats of the show aired on cable on the Odyssey Network (now Hallmark Channel) from 1999 to 2001. The Hub began airing reruns of the show on October 11, 2010 lasting until May 26, 2013. Antenna TV aired reruns from January 5, 2015 to January 1, 2018.

== Home media ==
Anchor Bay Entertainment released all four seasons of Doogie Howser, M.D. on DVD in Region 1 (United States and Canada) between 2005 and 2006. A Complete Collection release was announced on August 28, 2008, but was eventually canceled. All 4 seasons had been available to stream on Hulu, but expired on that service on June 27, 2023. The series was made available internationally on Star on Disney+ beginning March 15, 2023.

== Reception ==
=== Critical reception ===
According to Metacritic, Marvin Kitman of Newsday gave season 1 of Doogie Howser, M.D. a 40/100 score and commented: "What a wasted childhood my kids have had, I got to thinking while watching this otherwise normal Doogie Howser. It makes you look at your kids differently. What lazy bums they must be, still in high school at 16." Scott Weinberg of DVD Talk recommended season two: "It's not high art, but it's a heckuva lot better than what generally passes for your average weeknight sitcom." Christopher Smith of the Bangor Daily News gave season three a "C" grade and commented: "No classic, this series. [...T]he show has become gratingly cute, particularly in the episodes “Doogiesomething,” “Double Doogie with Cheese,” and “Lonesome Doog.” Doog, I'm Dooged out."

=== Awards and nominations ===
Year	Award	Result	Category	Recipient
1990	People's Choice Award	Won	Favorite New TV Comedy Series	
1990	Viewers for Quality Television Award	Nominated	Best Actor in a Quality Comedy Series	Neil Patrick Harris
1990	Viewers for Quality Television Award	Nominated	Best Supporting Actor in a Quality Comedy Series	Max Casella
1990	Young Artist Award	Won	Best Young Actor Starring in a Television Series	Neil Patrick Harris
1990	Young Artist Award	Nominated	Best New Television Series	
1990	Young Artist Award	Nominated	Best Young Actor Guest Starring in a Television Series	Michael Bacall
1991	Primetime Emmy Award	Won	Outstanding Sound Mixing for a Comedy Series or a Special	Joe Kenworthy (production sound mixer); Bill Thiederman (re-recording mixer); Dean Okrand (re-recording mixer); Mike Getlin (re-recording mixer) (for the episode "Doogenstein")
1991	Humanitas Prize	Nominated	30 Minute Network or Syndicated Television	Nat Bernstein; Mitchel Katlin (for the episode "To Live and Die in Brentwood")
1991	Young Artist Awards	Won	Best Young Actor Guest Starring in a Television Series	Christopher Pettiet
1991	Young Artist Awards	Won	Best Young Actor Starring in a Television Series	Neil Patrick Harris
1992	Primetime Emmy Award	Won	Outstanding Sound Mixing for a Comedy Series or a Special	Joe Kenworthy (production sound mixer); Bill Thiederman (re-recording mixer); Dean Okrand (re-recording mixer); Mike Getlin (re-recording mixer) (for the episode "Lonesome Doog")
1992	Primetime Emmy Award	Nominated	Outstanding Cinematography for a Series	Michael D. O'Shea (for the episode "Summer Of '91")
1992	Golden Globe Award	Nominated	Best Performance by an Actor in a TV-Series – Comedy/Musical	Neil Patrick Harris
1992	Young Artist Award	Won	Best Young Actor Starring in a Television Series	Neil Patrick Harris
1992	Young Artist Award	Nominated	Best Young Actress Co-starring in a Television Series	Lisa Dean Ryan
1993	Primetime Emmy Award	Won	Outstanding Sound Mixing for a Comedy Series or a Special	Joe Kenworthy (production sound mixer); Mike Getlin (re-recording mixer); Dean Okrand (re-recording mixer); Bill Thiederman (re-recording mixer) (for the episode "Doogie Got a Gun")

== Cultural influence ==
- Neil Patrick Harris has satirized his years playing a teenage medical doctor several times:
  - In an episode of Roseanne, Roseanne Conner (Roseanne Barr) has a dream after having undergone breast reduction surgery. She goes to the mirror and realizes that her breasts are comically larger than before. Doogie Howser (Harris) comes in and asks an upset Roseanne if they were supposed to be bigger.
  - Barney Stinson (also played by Harris) writes in his computerized diary at the end of the How I Met Your Mother episode "The Bracket," while the Doogie Howser theme music plays. In the later episode "The Stinsons," he also comments, "Call me crazy but child actors were way better in the '80s".
  - In the 2004 comedy Harold & Kumar Go to White Castle, Harris – playing a fictionalized version of himself – claims to have "humped every piece of ass ever on that show" (except the hot nurse, over whom he expresses regret). Harris is referred to as "Doogie Howser" while stealing Harold (John Cho)'s car from the convenience store. In Harold & Kumar Escape from Guantanamo Bay, Harris remarks, after taking psychotropic mushrooms, "Dude, I was able to perform an appendectomy at 14, I think I can handle a few 'shrooms".
  - In 2008, Harris appeared in commercials for Old Spice deodorant, claiming to be an expert because he "used to be a doctor for pretends".
  - During the opening of the 2009 TV Land Awards, Harris, who hosted the show, travels through "The TV Land Zone" (a spoof of The Twilight Zone), where he finds himself the star of TV classics. At one point, Harris walks into a doctor's office, dressed as Doogie, while the Doogie Howser, M.D. theme plays. After realizing where he is, he storms out, saying, "No no no, not gonna happen! Check my contract!"
  - On the January 10, 2009 episode of Saturday Night Live, an "SNL Digital Short" featured Harris, the episode's guest host, leading a full orchestra version of the Doogie Howser theme. When the song concludes, he turns toward the camera and sheds a tear.
  - On the March 14, 2011 episode of Jimmy Kimmel Live!, a "real doctor" played by Harris endorses Jimmy Kimmel's Jim-Miracle Diet, as the Doogie Howser theme plays.
  - Harris in 2017 joined other actors from medical television shows in Cigna's "TV Doctors of America" advertising campaign for annual checkups.
- Neil Patrick Harris played Doogie Howser in The Earth Day Special in 1990. In the special, Doogie, along with two other doctors (played by Dana Delany and James Brolin), are informed by the Back to the Future trilogy scientist Emmett L. Brown (played by Christopher Lloyd) on how to save Mother Nature (played by Bette Midler).
- In Anthony Bourdain's book Kitchen Confidential: Adventures in the Culinary Underbelly, any blond, good-looking waiter working in his restaurant is immediately nicknamed "Doogie Howser".
- Smart mice obtained by genetic engineering have been named "Doogie mice" in honor of Harris's character.
- In 2025, after it was announced that Harris was voicing Deadpool in Marvel's Deadpool VR, Ryan Reynolds posted an advertisement for the game where he pretended to portray Doogie Howser and write in his computer diary joking about Neil taking his role. Robyn Lively, Reynolds's sister-in-law, also makes an appearance.

== Real life comparisons ==
Balamurali Ambati graduated from the Mount Sinai School of Medicine and obtained his medical license when he was only 17 years old, a Guinness World Record, and has been compared to the fictional Doogie Howser, though Ambati himself disliked the association.

Sho Yano, who became the youngest student to attain an M.D. from the University of Chicago at 21 years old, has also been called a real-life Doogie Howser.

Doogie Howser has been used as a moniker for a few people involved in politics. In 2009, 13-year-old author and speaker Jonathan Krohn was nicknamed "Doogie Howser GOP". 17-year-old Evan Draim, the youngest delegate at the 2012 Republican National Convention, was referred to as a "Doogie Howser of the GOP". Republican congressman Aaron Schock has been referred to as a Doogie Howser for being the youngest member of Congress in 2009 at 27 years old. In 2015, Jon Stewart called Schock a "Doogie Howser wannabe" for his travel expenses and activities while still in office.

Some teenagers who have impersonated physicians are often referred to as Doogie Howser. Others who have excelled at a young age have been called Doogie Howser.

== Reboot ==
In April 2020, it was announced that a reboot titled Doogie Kameāloha, M.D., was in development for Disney+ with Kourtney Kang writing and co-executive producing with Melvin Mar, Jake Kasdan, and Bochco's wife, Dayna Bochco and son, Jesse Bochco. The new series focuses on Lahela “Doogie” Kameāloha (Peyton Elizabeth Lee), a female 16-year-old doctor in Hawaii given her nickname by others who have seen Doogie Howser, M.D.. Disney+ gave the series a 10-episode straight-to-series order in September 2020.
