= Markus Redmond =

American actor (b. 1971)

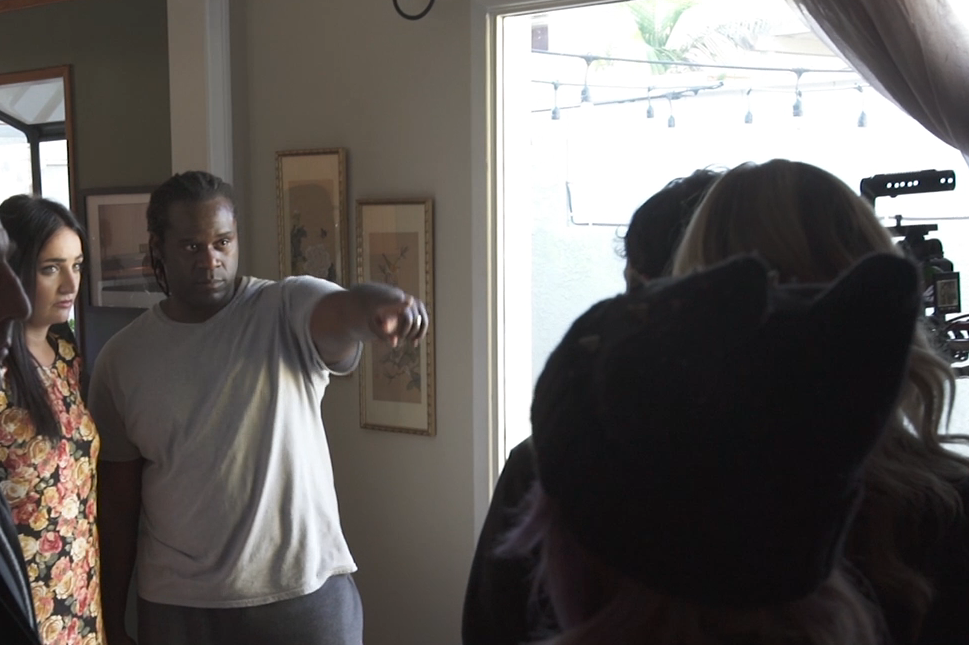
- Redmond directing Turkish actress Fadik Atasoy in 2014
- Born: February 5, 1971 (age 55); Philadelphia, Pennsylvania, U.S.
- Occupations: Actor, film director, screenwriter
- Years active: 1989–present
- Known for: Doogie Howser, M.D., Fight Club, The Inkwell, NYPD Blue, Murder One, If I Had Known I Was a Genius
- Spouse: Isis Heuser (2008–present)

Markus William Redmond (born February 5, 1971) is an American actor, director, and screenwriter.

== Career ==
In 2016, Redmond directed and starred in the independent film The 6th Degree, a psychological thriller he wrote and co-produced. The cast included Redmond, Mackenzie Astin, and Turkish actress Fadik Atasoy. The film was released on Amazon Prime.

In 2017, Redmond wrote and directed the comedy horror short film Allen + Millie: A Short Romance, starring Brooke Lewis and Courtney Gains. The short film received awards from the Los Angeles Film Awards and the Sicily International Film Festival.

=== Screenwriting ===
In 2000, Redmond and Ivy Williams sold their college thriller, I Would Die for You, to Columbia Pictures, although the film was not produced.

In 2007, Redmond wrote and starred in the independent film If I Had Known I Was a Genius. The cast included Whoopi Goldberg, Sharon Stone, Keith David, and Tara Reid. The film premiered on January 23, 2007, at the Sundance Film Festival.

=== Acting ===
Redmond's films credits include The Inkwell (1994), K-11 (2012), The Mating Habits of the Earthbound Human (1999); and How to Kill Your Neighbor's Dog.

On television, Redmond played recurring roles as Officer Lucas on NYPD Blue (1993-1994) and Mark Washington in Murder One (1995-1996). He also starred as Phil on the sitcom Family Rules (1999). Other television appearances include 21 Jump Street (1990), Family Matters (1990), Get Smart (1995), Mad About You (1997), Vengeance Unlimited (1999), Angel (1999, 2000), and The Drew Carey Show (2003).

=== Publishing ===
In 2024, Redmond signed a three-book deal with the Dafina imprint of Kensington for "Blood Slaves: The Blood Saga", to be distributed by Penguin Random House. The saga is a reimagining of the vampire origin story set during the early days of American slavery. The story blends alternate history with supernatural horror, as the last surviving member of an ancient African vampire tribe meets a slave desperate for freedom, and together, they lead an army of enslaved people in a blood-soaked battle for freedom and revenge. The hardcover was released on July 29, 2025.

=== Other media ===
Redmond has been a featured guest on Reddit Q&As and various entertainment podcasts. Since 2015, he has been a recurring interviewee on the YouTube filmmaking vlog channel Film Courage.

== Filmography ==
=== Film ===
Year	Film	Role	Notes
1994	The Inkwell	Daryl	Theatrical film
1999	The Mating Habits of the Earthbound Human	The Male's Best Friend	Direct-to-video film
1999	Fight Club	Detective Kevin	Theatrical film
2000	How to Kill Your Neighbor's Dog	Cop #3	Theatrical film
2007	If I Had Known I Was a Genius	Michael Reed - Lead role, also screenwriter	Theatrical film
2012	K-11	Precious	Theatrical film
2014	Pacific Standard	Nolan - Lead role, director-producer-screenwriter	Short Film
2016	This is Now	Michael - Lead role, director-producer-screenwriter	Theatrical film
2017	Allen + Millie: A Short Romance	Nicholas (voice) - Director-producer-screenwriter	Short Horror Feature
2019	The 6th Degree	A.J - Lead role, director-producer-screenwriter	Short Horror Feature
Pre-production	Wine & Whimsy	Vaughn Anderson - Lead role, director-producer-screenwriter	Theatrical film
Pre-production	After the Horizon	Roman - Lead role, director-producer-screenwriter	Theatrical film

=== Television ===
Year	Title	Role	Notes
1990	Exile	Jackson	Television film
1990	Family Matters	Bull	Episode: "In a Jam"
1990	21 Jump Street	Charles Winson Wallace	Episode: "Coppin' Out"
1990–1993	Doogie Howser, M.D.	Raymond Alexander	Series regular
1993–1994	NYPD Blue	P.O. Lucas	Recurring role, 5 episodes
1995	Get Smart	Duane	Pilot episode
1995–1996	Murder One	Mark Washington	Recurring role, 29 episodes
1996	Project ALF	Sgt. Rhomboid	Television film
1997	Mad About You	Dr. Kekitch	Episode: "Speed Baby"
1999	Vengeance Unlimited	Nate Cross	Episode: "Legalese"
1999	Family Rules	Phil	Series regular
1999 and 2000	Angel	Griff / Tom Cribb	Episodes: "Rm w/a Vu" & "The Ring"
2003	The Drew Carey Show	Delivery Guy	Episode: "Drew Takes a Guilt Trip"
2005	Curb Your Enthusiasm	Loud Man at Party	Episode: "The Bowtie"
2015	Dinner and Drinks	Vaughn Anderson - Lead role, director-producer-screenwriter	TV series

== Awards and nominations ==
Year	Award	Category	Nominated work	Result
1996	People's Choice Awards	Accepted Award for Ensemble - Favorite New TV Drama Series	Murder One	Won
2018	Accolade Competition	Best Short Film, Best Actress, Best Actor	Allen + Millie: A Short Romance	Won
2018	Hollywood Film Competition	Platinum Award - Best Director; Diamond Award, Best Actress	Allen + Millie: A Short Romance	Won
2018	Los Angeles Horror Competition	Diamond Award - Best Short, Best Actress, Best Actor	Allen + Millie: A Short Romance	Won
2018	Sicily International Film Festival	Jury Prize - Best Director, Best Romance, Best Acting	Allen + Millie: A Short Romance	Won
2018	West Coast International Film Festival	Outstanding Directing, Screenplay and Performances	Allen + Millie: A Short Romance	Won
