= James Tin Yau So =

Acupuncturist

James Tin-Yau So (1911–2000; Chinese name: 苏天佑, pinyin: Su Tianyou) was an acupuncturist who founded one of the first acupuncture schools in the United States, in 1974.

== See also ==
- Traditional Chinese Medicine
- Classical Chinese Medicine
