= Michael Josephson =

Former law professor and attorney

- Born: December 10, 1942 (age 83)
- Occupations: Speaker and lecturer, former law professor and attorney
- Known for: Joseph and Edna Josephson Institute of Ethics

Michael Josephson (born December 10, 1942) is a former law professor and attorney who founded the nonprofit Joseph and Edna Josephson Institute of Ethics located in Los Angeles, California, out of which he operates as a speaker and lecturer on the subject of ethics. The institute is named after his parents.

Josephson's daily commentary is carried on Armed Forces Radio, and was formerly carried on Los Angeles radio station KNX 1070. He is also the president of the national CHARACTER COUNTS! Coalition, a part of the Josephson Institute of Ethics.

A graduate of the University of California at Los Angeles (UCLA), Josephson was named its 2009 alumnus of the year. Josephson currently resides in southern California with wife Anne and his 5 children.

== Works ==
Josephson has written various books on the subjects of character and ethics, including:

- Making Ethical Decisions (1995, updated edition, 2002)
- The Power of Character (co-editor, 1998)
- Parenting to Build Character in Your Teen (co author, 2001)
- You Don't Have To Be Sick To Get Better! (2001)
- The Best Is Yet To Come (2002)
